Charles André Joseph Marie de Gaulle (commonly abbreviated as CDG and known in France simply as "le général", "the general"; 22 November 18909 November 1970) was a French army officer and statesman who led Free France against Nazi Germany in World War II and chaired the Provisional Government of the French Republic from 1944 to 1946 in order to restore democracy in France. In 1958, he came out of retirement when appointed President of the Council of Ministers (Prime Minister) by President René Coty. He rewrote the Constitution of France and founded the Fifth Republic after approval by referendum. He was elected President of France later that year, a position to which he was reelected in 1965 and held until his resignation in 1969.

Born in Lille, he graduated from Saint-Cyr in 1912. He was a decorated officer of the First World War, wounded several times and later taken prisoner at Verdun. During the interwar period, he advocated mobile armoured divisions. During the German invasion of May 1940, he led an armoured division which counterattacked the invaders; he was then appointed Undersecretary for War. Refusing to accept his government's armistice with Germany, de Gaulle fled to England and exhorted the French to resist occupation and to continue the fight in his Appeal of 18 June. He led the Free French Forces and later headed the French National Liberation Committee against the Axis. Despite frosty relations with the United States, he generally had Winston Churchill's support and emerged as the undisputed leader of Free France. He became head of the Provisional Government of the French Republic in June 1944, the interim government of France following its liberation. As early as 1944, de Gaulle introduced a dirigiste economic policy, which included substantial state-directed control over a capitalist economy which was followed by 30 years of unprecedented growth, known as the Trente Glorieuses. Frustrated by the return of petty partisanship in the new Fourth Republic, he resigned in early 1946 but continued to be politically active as founder of the Rassemblement du Peuple Français (RPF; "Rally of the French People"). He retired in the early 1950s and wrote his War Memoirs, which quickly became a staple of modern French literature.

When the Algerian War was ripping apart the unstable Fourth Republic, the National Assembly brought him back to power during the May 1958 crisis. He founded the Fifth Republic with a strong presidency, and he was elected to continue in that role. He managed to keep France together while taking steps to end the war, much to the anger of the Pieds-Noirs (ethnic French born in Algeria) and the armed forces; both previously had supported his return to power to maintain colonial rule. He granted independence to Algeria and acted progressively towards other French colonies. In the context of the Cold War, de Gaulle initiated his "politics of grandeur", asserting that France as a major power should not rely on other countries, such as the United States, for its national security and prosperity. To this end, he pursued a policy of "national independence" which led him to withdraw from NATO's integrated military command and to launch an independent nuclear strike force that made France the world's fourth nuclear power. He restored cordial Franco-German relations to create a European counterweight between the Anglo-American and Soviet spheres of influence through the signing of the Élysée Treaty on 22 January 1963.

De Gaulle opposed any development of a supranational Europe, favouring Europe as a continent of sovereign nations. De Gaulle openly criticised the United States intervention in Vietnam and the "exorbitant privilege" of the United States dollar. In his later years, his support for the slogan "Vive le Québec libre" and his two vetoes of Britain's entry into the European Economic Community generated considerable controversy in both North America and Europe. Although reelected to the presidency in 1965, he faced widespread protests by students and workers in May 1968, but had the Army's support and won an election with an increased majority in the National Assembly. De Gaulle resigned in 1969 after losing a referendum in which he proposed more decentralisation. He died a year later at his residence in Colombey-les-Deux-Églises, leaving his presidential memoirs unfinished.

Many French political parties and leaders claim a Gaullist legacy; many streets and monuments in France were dedicated to his memory after his death.

Early life

Childhood and origins 

Charles André Joseph Marie de Gaulle was born on 22 November 1890 in Lille in the Nord department, the third of five children. He was raised in a devoutly Catholic and traditional family. His father, Henri de Gaulle, was a professor of history and literature at a Jesuit college and eventually founded his own school.

Henri de Gaulle came from a long line of parliamentary gentry from Normandy and Burgundy. The name is thought to be Dutch in origin, and may well have derived from van der Walle, de Walle ("from the rampart, defensive wall") or de Waal ("the wall") De Gaulle's mother, Jeanne (born Maillot), descended from a family of wealthy entrepreneurs from Lille. She had French, Irish, Scottish, and German ancestry.

De Gaulle's father encouraged historical and philosophical debate between his children at mealtimes, and through his encouragement, de Gaulle grew familiar with French history from an early age. Struck by his mother's tales of how she cried as a child when she heard of the French capitulation to the Germans at Sedan in 1870, he developed a keen interest in military strategy. He was also influenced by his uncle, also named Charles de Gaulle, who was a historian and passionate Celticist who wrote books and pamphlets advocating the union of the Welsh, Scots, Irish, and Bretons into one people. His grandfather Julien-Philippe was also a historian, and his grandmother Josephine-Marie wrote poems which impassioned his Christian faith.

Education and intellectual influences 

By the time he was ten he was reading medieval history. De Gaulle began writing in his early teens, especially poetry, and later his family paid for a composition, a one-act play in verse about a traveller, to be privately published. A voracious reader, he favored philosophical tomes by such writers as Bergson, Péguy, and Barrès. In addition to the German philosophers Nietzsche, Kant, and Goethe, he read the works of the ancient Greeks (especially Plato) and the prose of the romanticist poet Chateaubriand.

De Gaulle was educated in Paris at the Collège Stanislas and studied briefly in Belgium where he continued to display his interest in reading and studying history and shared the great pride many of his countrymen felt in their nation's achievements. At the age of fifteen he wrote an essay imagining "General de Gaulle" leading the French Army to victory over Germany in 1930; he later wrote that in his youth he had looked forward with somewhat naive anticipation to the inevitable future war with Germany to avenge the French defeat of 1870.

France during de Gaulle's teenage years was a divided society, with many developments which were unwelcome to the de Gaulle family: the growth of socialism and syndicalism, the legal separation of Church and state in 1905, and the reduction in the term of military service to two years in the same year. Equally unwelcome were the Entente Cordiale with Britain, the First Moroccan Crisis, and above all the Dreyfus Affair. Henri de Gaulle came to be a supporter of Dreyfus, but was less concerned with his innocence per se than with the disgrace which the army had brought onto itself. The same period also saw a resurgence in evangelical Catholicism, the dedication of the Sacré-Cœur, Paris, and the rise of the cult of Joan of Arc.

De Gaulle was not an outstanding pupil until his mid-teens, but from July 1906 he worked harder at school as he focused on winning a place to train as an army officer at the military academy, Saint-Cyr. Lacouture suggests that de Gaulle joined the army, despite being by inclination more suited to a career as a writer and historian, partly to please his father and partly because it was one of the few unifying forces which represented the whole of French society. He later wrote that "when I entered the Army, it was one of the greatest things in the world", a claim which Lacouture points out needs to be treated with caution: the army's reputation was at a low ebb in the early 1900s after the Dreyfus Affair. It was used extensively for strike-breaking and there were fewer than 700 applicants for St Cyr in 1908, down from 2,000 at the turn of the century.

Early career

Officer cadet and lieutenant 

De Gaulle won a place at St Cyr in 1909. His class ranking was mediocre (119th out of 221 entrants), but he was relatively young and this was his first attempt at the exam. Under a law of 21 March 1905, aspiring army officers were required to serve a year in the ranks, including time both as a private and as an NCO, before attending the academy. This was a historic regiment with Austerlitz, Wagram, and Borodino amongst its battle honours. In April 1910 he was promoted to corporal. His company commander declined to promote him to sergeant, the usual rank for a potential officer, commenting that the young man clearly felt that nothing less than Constable of France would be good enough for him. He was eventually promoted to sergeant in September 1910.

De Gaulle took up his place at St Cyr in October 1910. By the end of his first year he had risen to 45th place. At St Cyr, de Gaulle acquired the nickname of "the great asparagus" because of his height (196 cm, 6'5"), high forehead, and nose. He did well at the academy and received praise for his conduct, manners, intelligence, character, military spirit, and resistance to fatigue. In 1912, he graduated 13th in his class and his passing-out report noted that he was a gifted cadet who would undoubtedly make an excellent officer. The future Marshal Alphonse Juin passed out first in the class, although the two do not appear to have been close friends at the time.

Preferring to serve in France rather than the distant overseas colonies, in October 1912 he rejoined the 33rd Infantry Regiment as a sous-lieutenant (second lieutenant). The regiment was now commanded by Colonel (and future Marshal) Philippe Pétain, whom de Gaulle would follow for the next 15 years. He later wrote in his memoirs: "My first colonel, Pétain, taught me the art of command".

It has been claimed that in the build-up to World War I, de Gaulle agreed with Pétain about the obsolescence of cavalry and of traditional tactics in the age of machine guns and barbed wire, and often debated great battles and the likely outcome of any coming war with his superior. Lacouture is sceptical, pointing out that although Pétain wrote glowing appraisals of de Gaulle in the first two-quarters of 1913, it is unlikely that he stood out among the 19 captains and 32 lieutenants under his command. De Gaulle would have been present at the 1913 Arras manoeuvres, at which Pétain criticised General  to his face, but there is no evidence in his notebooks that he accepted Pétain's unfashionable ideas about the importance of firepower against the dominant doctrine emphasizing "offensive spirit". De Gaulle stressed how Maurice de Saxe had banned volley fire, how French armies of the Napoleonic period had relied on infantry column attack, and how French military power had declined in the nineteenth century because of – supposedly – excessive concentration on firepower (e.g. the Chassepot rifle) rather than élan. He also appears to have accepted the then fashionable lesson drawn from the recent Russo-Japanese War, of how bayonet charges by Japanese infantry with high morale had succeeded in the face of enemy firepower.

De Gaulle was promoted to first lieutenant in October 1913.

First World War

Combat 

When war finally broke out in France in early August 1914, the 33rd Regiment, considered one of the best fighting units in France, was immediately thrown into checking the German advance at Dinant. However, the French Fifth Army commander, General Charles Lanrezac, remained wedded to 19th-century battle tactics, throwing his units into pointless bayonet charges with bugles and full colours flying against German artillery, incurring heavy losses.

As a platoon commander, de Gaulle was involved in fierce fighting from the outset. He received his baptism of fire on 15 August and was among the first to be wounded, receiving a bullet in the knee at the Battle of Dinant. It is sometimes claimed that in hospital, he grew bitter at the tactics used, and spoke with other injured officers against the outdated methods of the French army. However, there is no contemporary evidence that he understood the importance of artillery in modern warfare. Instead, in his writing at the time, he criticised the "overrapid" offensive, the inadequacy of French generals, and the "slowness of the English troops".

He rejoined his regiment in October, as commander of the 7th company. Many of his former comrades were already dead. In December he became regimental adjutant.

De Gaulle's unit gained recognition for repeatedly crawling out into no man's land to listen to the conversations of the enemy in their trenches, and the information brought back was so valuable that on 18 January 1915 he received the Croix de Guerre. On 10 February he was promoted to captain, initially on probation. On 10 March 1915, de Gaulle was shot in the left hand, a wound which initially seemed trivial but became infected. The wound incapacitated him for four months and later forced him to wear his wedding ring on the right hand. In August he commanded the 10th company before returning to duty as regimental adjutant. On 3 September 1915 his rank of captain became permanent. In late October, returning from leave, he returned to command of 10th company again.

As a company commander at Douaumont (during the Battle of Verdun) on 2 March 1916, while leading a charge to try to break out of a position which had become surrounded by the enemy, he received a bayonet wound to the left thigh after being stunned by a shell and was captured after passing out from the effects of poison gas. He was one of the few survivors of his battalion. He was pulled out of an empty shell crater by German soldiers and taken prisoner. The circumstances of his capture would later become a subject of debate as anti-Gaullists spread rumour that he had actually surrendered, a claim de Gaulle nonchalantly dismissed.

Prisoner 

In captivity, de Gaulle read German newspapers (he had learned German at school and spent a summer vacation in Germany) and gave talks on his view of the course of the conflict to fellow prisoners. His patriotic fervour and confidence in victory earned him yet another nickname, Le Connétable ("The Constable"), the title of the medieval commander-in-chief of the French army. In Ingolstadt were also journalist Remy Roure, who would eventually become a political ally of de Gaulle, and Mikhail Tukhachevsky, a future commander of the Red Army. During his time as a POW, de Gaulle became well acquainted with Tukhachevsky, whose theories about a fast-moving, mechanized army closely resembled his. While a prisoner of war, de Gaulle wrote his first book, Discorde chez l'ennemi (The Enemy's House Divided), analysing the issues and divisions within the German forces. The book was published in 1924.

Originally interned at Rosenberg Fortress, he was quickly moved to progressively higher-security facilities like Ingolstadt. In total, De Gaulle made five unsuccessful escape attempts, and was routinely punished with long periods of solitary confinement and the withdrawal of privileges such as newspapers and tobacco. He attempted escape by hiding in a laundry basket, digging a tunnel, digging a hole through a wall, and even posing as a nurse to fool his guards. In his letters to his parents, he constantly spoke of his frustration that the war was continuing without him, calling the situation "a shameful misfortune" and compared it to being cuckolded. As the war neared its end, he grew depressed that he was playing no part in the victory, but despite his efforts, he remained in captivity until the armistice. On 1 December 1918, three weeks later, he returned to his father's house in the Dordogne to be reunited with his three brothers, who had all served in the army and survived the war.

Between the wars

Early 1920s: Poland and staff college 

After the armistice, de Gaulle served with the staff of the French Military Mission to Poland as an instructor of Poland's infantry during its war with communist Russia (1919–1921). He distinguished himself in operations near the River Zbrucz, with the rank of major in the Polish army, and won Poland's highest military decoration, the Virtuti Militari.

De Gaulle returned to France, where he became a lecturer in military history at St Cyr. He was already a powerful speaker, after practice as a prisoner of war. He then studied at the École de Guerre (staff college) from November 1922 to October 1924. Here he clashed with his instructor Colonel Moyrand by arguing for tactics based on circumstances rather than doctrine, and after an exercise in which he had played the role of commander, he refused to answer a question about supplies, replying "de minimis non-curat praetor" ("a leader does not concern himself with trivia") before ordering the responsible officer to answer Moyrand. He obtained respectable, but not outstanding grades – 15 or so out of 20 – on many of his assessments. Moyrand wrote in his final report that he was "an intelligent, cultured and serious-minded officer; has brilliance and talent" but criticised him for not deriving as much benefit from the course as he should have done, and for his arrogance: his "excessive self-confidence", his harsh dismissal of the views of others "and his attitude of a King in exile". Having entered 33rd out of 129, he graduated in 52nd place, with a grade of assez bien ("good enough"). He was posted to Mainz to help supervise supplies of food and equipment for the French Army of Occupation.
De Gaulle's book La Discorde chez l'ennemi had appeared in March 1924. In March 1925 he published an essay on the use of tactics according to circumstances, a deliberate gesture in defiance of Moyrand.

Mid-1920s: ghostwriter for Pétain 
De Gaulle's career was saved by Pétain, who arranged for his staff college grade to be amended to bien ("good"—but not the "excellent" which would have been needed for a general staff posting). From 1 July 1925 he worked for Pétain (as part of the Maison Pétain), largely as a "pen officer" (ghostwriter). De Gaulle disapproved of Pétain's decision to take command in Morocco in 1925 (he was later known to remark that "Marshal Pétain was a great man. He died in 1925, but he did not know it") and of what he saw as the lust for public adulation of Pétain and his wife. In 1925 de Gaulle began to cultivate Joseph Paul-Boncour, his first political patron. On 1 December 1925 he published an essay on the "Historical Role of French Fortresses". This was a popular topic because of the Maginot Line which was then being planned, but his argument was quite nuanced: he argued that the aim of fortresses should be to weaken the enemy, not to economise on defence.

Friction arose between de Gaulle and Pétain over Le Soldat, a history of the French soldier which he had ghost-written and for which he wanted greater writing credit. He had written mainly historical material, but Pétain wanted to add a final chapter of his own thoughts. There was at least one stormy meeting late in 1926 after which de Gaulle was seen to emerge, white with anger, from Pétain's office. In October 1926 he returned to his duties with the Headquarters of the Army of the Rhine.

De Gaulle had sworn that he would never return to the École de Guerre except as commandant, but at Pétain's invitation, and introduced to the stage by his patron, he delivered three lectures there in April 1927: "Leadership in Wartime", "Character", and "Prestige". These later formed the basis for his book The Edge of the Sword (1932). Many of the officers in the audience were his seniors, who had taught and examined him only a few years earlier.

Late-1920s: Trier and Beirut 
After spending twelve years as a captain, a normal period, de Gaulle was promoted to commandant (major) on 25 September 1927. In November 1927 he began a two-year posting as commanding officer of the 19th chasseurs à pied (a battalion of élite light infantry) with the occupation forces at Trier (Treves).

De Gaulle trained his men hard (a river crossing exercise of the freezing Moselle River at night was vetoed by his commanding general). He imprisoned a soldier for appealing to his deputy (Member of Parliament) for a transfer to a cushier unit, and when investigated initially tried to invoke his status as a member of the Maison Pétain, eventually appealing to Pétain to protect himself from a reprimand for interfering with the soldier's political rights. An observer wrote of de Gaulle at this time that although he encouraged young officers, "his ego...glowed from far off". In the winter of 1928–1929, thirty soldiers ("not counting Annamese") died from so-called "German flu", seven of them from de Gaulle's battalion. After an investigation, he was singled out for praise in the ensuing parliamentary debate as an exceptionally capable commanding officer, and mention of how he had worn a mourning band for a private soldier who was an orphan earned an exclamation of praise from the Prime Minister Raymond Poincaré.

The breach between de Gaulle and Pétain over the ghost-writing of Le Soldat had deepened in 1928. Pétain brought in a new ghostwriter, Colonel Audet, who was unwilling to take on the job and wrote to de Gaulle in some embarrassment to take over the project. Pétain was quite friendly about the matter but did not publish the book. In 1929 Pétain did not use de Gaulle's draft text for his eulogy for the late Ferdinand Foch, whose seat at the Academie Française he was assuming.

The Allied occupation of the Rhineland was coming to an end, and de Gaulle's battalion was due to be disbanded, although the decision was later rescinded after he had moved to his next posting. De Gaulle wanted a teaching post at the École de Guerre in 1929. There was apparently a threat of mass resignation of the faculty were he appointed to a position there. There was talk of a posting to Corsica or North Africa, but on Pétain's advice he accepted a two-year posting to Lebanon and Syria. In Beirut he was chief of the 3rd Bureau (military operations) of General Louis-Paul-Gaston de Bigault du Granrut, who wrote him a glowing reference recommending him for high command in the future.

1930s: staff officer 
In the spring of 1931, as his posting in Beirut drew to a close, de Gaulle once again asked Pétain for a posting to the École de Guerre. Pétain tried to obtain an appointment for him as Professor of History there, but once again the faculty would not have him. Instead de Gaulle, drawing on plans he had drawn up in 1928 for reform of that institution, asked Pétain to create a special post for him which would enable him to lecture on "the Conduct of War" both to the École de Guerre and to the Centre des Hautes Études Militaires (CHEM – a senior staff college for generals, known as the "school for marshals"), and also to civilians at the École Normale Supérieure, and to civil servants.

Pétain instead advised him to apply for a posting to the Secrétariat Général du Conseil Supérieur de la Défense Nationale (SGDN – General Secretariat of the Supreme War Council, reporting to the Under-Secretary to the Prime Minister, although later moved to the Ministry of War in 1936) in Paris. Pétain promised to lobby for the appointment, which he thought would be good experience for him. De Gaulle was posted to SGDN in November 1931, initially as a "drafting officer".

He was promoted to lieutenant-colonel in December 1932 and appointed Head of the Third Section (operations). His service at SGDN gave him six years' experience of the interface between army planning and government, enabling him to take on ministerial responsibilities in 1940.

After studying arrangements in the US, Italy, and Belgium, de Gaulle drafted a bill for the organisation of the country in time of war. He made a presentation about his bill to the CHEM. The bill passed the Chamber of Deputies but failed in the Senate.

Early 1930s: proponent of armoured warfare 
Unlike Pétain, de Gaulle believed in the use of tanks and rapid maneuvers rather than trench warfare. De Gaulle became a disciple of Émile Mayer (1851–1938), a retired lieutenant-colonel (his career had been damaged by the Dreyfus Affair) and military thinker. Mayer thought that although wars were still bound to happen, it was "obsolete" for civilised countries to threaten or wage war on one another as they had in previous centuries. He had a low opinion of the quality of French generals, and was a critic of the Maginot Line and a proponent of mechanised warfare. Lacouture suggests that Mayer focused de Gaulle's thoughts away from his obsession with the mystique of the strong leader (Le Fil d'Epée: 1932) and back to loyalty to Republican institutions and military reform.

In 1934 de Gaulle wrote Vers l'Armée de Métier (Towards a Professional Army). He proposed mechanization of the infantry, with stress on an élite force of 100,000 men and 3,000 tanks. The book imagined tanks driving around the country like cavalry. De Gaulle's mentor Emile Mayer was somewhat more prophetic than he was about the future importance of air power on the battlefield. Such an army would both compensate for France's population shortage, and be an efficient tool to enforce international law, particularly the Treaty of Versailles, which forbade Germany from rearming. He also thought it would be a precursor to a deeper national reorganisation, and wrote that "a master has to make his appearance [...] whose orders cannot be challenged – a man upheld by public opinion".

Only 700 copies were sold in France; the claim that thousands of copies were sold in Germany is thought to be an exaggeration. De Gaulle used the book to widen his contacts among journalists, notably with André Pironneau, editor of L'Écho de Paris. The book attracted praise across the political spectrum, apart from the hard left who were committed to the Republican ideal of a citizen army. De Gaulle's views attracted the attention of the maverick politician Paul Reynaud, to whom he wrote frequently, sometimes in obsequious terms. Reynaud first invited him to meet him on 5 December 1934.

The de Gaulle family were very private. De Gaulle was deeply focused on his career at this time. There is no evidence that he was tempted by fascism, and there is little evidence of his views either on domestic upheavals in 1934 and 1936 or the many foreign policy crises of the decade. He approved of the rearmament drive which the Popular Front government began in 1936, although French military doctrine remained that tanks should be used in penny packets for infantry support (ironically, in 1940 it would be German panzer units that would be used in a manner similar to what de Gaulle had advocated). A rare insight into de Gaulle's political views is a letter to his mother warning her that war with Germany was sooner or later inevitable and reassuring her that Pierre Laval's pact with the USSR in 1935 was for the best, likening it to Francis I's alliance with the Turks against the Emperor Charles V.

Late-1930s: tank regiment 
From April 1936, whilst still in his staff position at SGDN, de Gaulle was also a lecturer to generals at CHEM. De Gaulle's superiors disapproved of his views about tanks, and he was passed over for promotion to full colonel in 1936, supposedly because his service record was not good enough. He interceded with his political patron Reynaud, who showed his record to the Minister of War Édouard Daladier. Daladier, who was an enthusiast for rearmament with modern weapons, ensured that his name was entered onto the promotion list for the following year.

In 1937 General Bineau, who had taught him at St Cyr, wrote on his report on his lectureship at CHEM that he was highly able and suitable for high command in the future, but that he hid his attributes under "a cold and lofty attitude". He was put in command of the 507th Tank Regiment (consisting of a battalion of medium Char D2s and a battalion of R35 light tanks) at Metz on 13 July 1937, and his promotion to full colonel took effect on 24 December that year. De Gaulle attracted public attention by leading a parade of 80 tanks into the Place d'Armes at Metz, in his command tank "Austerlitz".

By now de Gaulle was beginning to be a well-known figure, known as "Colonel Motor(s)". At the invitation of the publisher Plon, he produced another book, La France et son Armée (France and Her Army) in 1938. De Gaulle incorporated much of the text he had written for Pétain a decade earlier for the uncompleted book Le Soldat, to Pétain's displeasure. In the end, de Gaulle agreed to include a dedication to Pétain (although he wrote his own rather than using the draft Pétain sent him), which was later dropped from postwar editions. Until 1938 Pétain had treated de Gaulle, as Lacouture puts it, "with unbounded good will", but by October 1938 he privately thought his former protégé "an ambitious man, and very ill-bred".

Second World War: the Fall of France

Early war 
At the outbreak of World War II, de Gaulle was put in command of the French Fifth Army's tanks (five scattered battalions, largely equipped with R35 light tanks) in Alsace. On 12 September 1939 he attacked at Bitche, simultaneously with the Saar Offensive.

At the start of October 1939, Reynaud asked for a staff posting under de Gaulle, but in the event remained at his post as Minister of Finance. De Gaulle's tanks were inspected by President Lebrun, who was impressed, but regretted that it was too late to implement his ideas. He wrote a paper L'Avènement de la force mécanique (The coming of the Armoured Force) which he sent to General Georges (commander-in-chief on the northeast front – who was not especially impressed) and the politician Leon Blum. Daladier, Prime Minister at the time, was too busy to read it.

In late-February 1940, Reynaud told de Gaulle that he had been earmarked for command of an armoured division as soon as one became available. Early in 1940 (the exact date is uncertain), de Gaulle proposed to Reynaud that he be appointed Secretary-General of the War Council, which would in effect have made him the government's military adviser. When Reynaud became prime minister in March he was reliant on Daladier's backing, so the job went instead to the politician Paul Baudouin.

In late-March, de Gaulle was told by Reynaud that he would be given command of the 4th Armoured Division, due to form by 15 May. The government appeared likely to be restructured, as Daladier and Maurice Gamelin (commander-in-chief) were under attack in the aftermath of the Allied defeat in Norway, and had this happened de Gaulle, who on 3 May, was still lobbying Reynaud for a restructuring of the control of the war, might well have joined the government. By 7 May he was assembling the staff of his new division.

Battle of France: division commander 

The Germans attacked the West on 10 May. De Gaulle activated his new division on 12 May. The Germans broke through at Sedan on 15 May 1940. That day, with three tank battalions assembled, less than a third of his paper strength, he was summoned to headquarters and told to attack to gain time for General Robert Touchon's Sixth Army to redeploy from the Maginot Line to the Aisne. General Georges told him it was his chance to implement his ideas.

De Gaulle commandeered some retreating cavalry and artillery units and also received an extra half-brigade, one of whose battalions included some heavy B1 bis tanks. The attack at Montcornet, a key road junction near Laon, began around 04:30 on 17 May. Outnumbered and without air support, he lost 23 of his 90 vehicles to mines, anti-tank weapons, and Stukas. On 18 May he was reinforced by two fresh regiments of armoured cavalry, bringing his strength up to 150 vehicles. He attacked again on 19 May and his forces were once again devastated by Stukas and artillery. He ignored orders from General Georges to withdraw, and in the early afternoon demanded two more divisions from Touchon, who refused his request. Although de Gaulle's tanks forced German infantry to retreat to Caumont, the action brought only temporary relief and did little to slow the spearhead of the German advance. Nevertheless, it was one of the few successes the French enjoyed while suffering defeats elsewhere across the country.

He delayed his retreat until 20 May. On 21 May, at the request of propaganda officers, he gave a talk on French radio about his recent attack. In recognition for his efforts de Gaulle was promoted to the rank of temporary (acting, in Anglophone parlance) brigadier-general on 23 May 1940. Despite being compulsorily retired as a colonel on 22 June (see below) he would wear the uniform of a brigadier-general for the rest of his life.

On 28–29 May, de Gaulle attacked the German bridgehead south of the Somme at Abbeville, taking around 400 German prisoners in the last attempt to cut an escape route for the Allied forces falling back on Dunkirk.

The future General Paul Huard, who served under de Gaulle at this time, recorded how he would often stand on a piece of high ground, keeping other officers literally at six yards' distance, subjecting his subordinates to harsh criticism and making all decisions autocratically himself, behaviour consistent with his later conduct as a political leader. Lacouture points out that for all his undoubted energy and physical courage there is no evidence in his brief period of command that he possessed the "hunter's eye" of the great battlefield commander, and that not a single one of his officers joined him in London, although some joined the Resistance in France.

De Gaulle's rank of brigadier-general became effective on 1 June 1940. That day he was in Paris. After a visit to his tailor to be fitted for his general's uniform, he visited Reynaud, who appears to have offered him a government job for the first time, and later afterwards the commander-in-chief Maxime Weygand, who congratulated him on saving France's honour and asked him for his advice. On 2 June he sent a memo to Weygand vainly urging that the French armoured divisions be consolidated from four weak divisions into three stronger ones and concentrated into an armoured corps under his command. He made the same suggestion to Reynaud.

Battle of France: government minister 
On 5 June, the day the Germans began the second phase of their offensive (Fall Rot), Prime Minister Paul Reynaud appointed de Gaulle a government minister, as Under-Secretary of State for National Defence and War, with particular responsibility for coordination with the British. Weygand objected to the appointment, thinking him "a mere child". Pétain (Deputy Prime Minister) was also displeased at his appointment and told Reynaud the story of the ghost-writing of Le Soldat. His appointment received a good deal of press attention, both in France and in the UK. He asked for an English-speaking aide and Geoffroy Chodron de Courcel was given the job.

On 8 June, de Gaulle visited Weygand, who believed it was "the end" and that after France was defeated Britain would also soon sue for peace. He hoped that after an armistice the Germans would allow him to retain enough of a French Army to "maintain order" in France. He gave a "despairing laugh" when de Gaulle suggested fighting on.

On 9 June, de Gaulle flew to London and met British Prime Minister Winston Churchill for the first time. It was thought that half a million men could be evacuated to French North Africa, provided the British and French navies and air forces coordinated their efforts. Either at this meeting or on 16 June, he urged Churchill in vain to throw more Royal Air Force (RAF) aircraft into the Battle of France, but conceded there and then that Churchill was right to refuse.

In his memoirs, de Gaulle mentioned his support for the proposal to continue the war from French North Africa, but at the time he was more in favour of the plan to form a "redoubt" in Brittany than he later admitted.

Italy entered the war on 10 June. That day de Gaulle was present at two meetings with Weygand (he only mentions one in his memoirs), one at the defence committee and a second where Weygand barged into Reynaud's office and demanded an armistice. When Weygand asked de Gaulle, who wanted to carry on fighting, if he had "anything to suggest", de Gaulle replied that it was the government's job to give orders, not to make suggestions. De Gaulle wanted Paris to be stubbornly defended by de Lattre, but instead it was declared an open city. At around 23:00 Reynaud and de Gaulle left Paris for Tours; the rest of the government left Paris on 11 June.

Battle of France: Briare and Tours 
On 11 June, de Gaulle drove to Arcis-sur-Aube and offered General Charles Huntziger (Commander of the Central Army Group) Weygand's job as Commander-in-Chief. Huntziger accepted in principle (although according to Henri Massis he was merely amused at the prospect of forming a Breton redoubt – Huntziger would sign the armistice on behalf of Pétain a few weeks later) but de Gaulle was unable to persuade Reynaud to sack Weygand.

Later on 11 June, de Gaulle attended the meeting of the Anglo-French Supreme War Council at the Chateau du Muguet at Briare. The British were represented by Churchill, Anthony Eden, General John Dill (Chief of the Imperial General Staff), General Hastings Ismay and Edward Spears, and the French by Reynaud, Pétain, Weygand, and Georges. Churchill demanded that the French take to guerrilla warfare, and reminded Pétain of how he had come to the aid of the British with forty French divisions in March 1918, receiving a dusty answer in each case. De Gaulle's fighting spirit made a strong impression on the British. At the meeting de Gaulle met Pétain for the first time in two years. Pétain noted his recent promotion to general, adding that he did not congratulate him, as ranks were of no use in defeat. When de Gaulle protested that Pétain himself had been promoted to brigadier-general and division commander at the Battle of the Marne in 1914, he replied that there was "no comparison" with the present situation. De Gaulle later conceded that Pétain was right about that much at least. De Gaulle missed the second day of the conference as he was in Rennes for a meeting (not mentioned in his memoirs) to discuss the plans for the Breton redoubt with General René Altmayer. He then returned to attend a cabinet meeting, at which it was clear that there was a growing movement for an armistice, and which decided that the government should move to Bordeaux rather than de Gaulle's preference for Quimper in Brittany.

On 13 June, de Gaulle attended another Anglo-French conference at Tours with Churchill, Lord Halifax, Lord Beaverbrook, Spears, Ismay, and Alexander Cadogan. This time few other major French figures were present apart from Reynaud and Baudoin. He was an hour late, and his account is not reliable. Reynaud demanded that France be released from the agreement which he had made with Prime Minister Neville Chamberlain in March 1940, so that France could seek an armistice. De Gaulle wrote that Churchill was sympathetic to France seeking an armistice, provided that an agreement was reached about what was to happen to the French fleet. This claim was later made by apologists for the Vichy Regime, e.g., General Georges, who claimed that Churchill had supported the armistice as a means of keeping the Germans out of French North Africa. However, is not supported by other eyewitnesses (Churchill himself, Roland de Margerie, Spears) who agree that Churchill said that he "understood" the French action but that he did not agree with it. He murmured at de Gaulle that he was "l'homme du destin (the man of destiny)", although it is unclear whether de Gaulle actually heard him. At the cabinet meeting that evening Pétain strongly supported Weygand's demand for an armistice, and said that he himself would remain in France to share the suffering of the French people and to begin the national rebirth. De Gaulle was dissuaded from resigning by the Interior Minister Georges Mandel, who argued that the war was only just beginning, and that de Gaulle needed to keep his reputation unsullied.

Battle of France: Franco-British Union 
De Gaulle arrived at Bordeaux on 14 June, and was given a new mission to go to London to discuss the potential evacuation to North Africa. He had a brief meeting with Admiral Darlan about the potential role of the French Navy. That evening, by coincidence, he dined in the same restaurant as Pétain: he went over to shake his hand in silence, the last time they ever met. Next morning no aircraft could be found so he had to drive to Brittany, where he visited his wife and daughters, and his aged mother (whom he never saw again, as she died in July), before taking a boat to Plymouth (he asked the skipper if he would be willing to carry on the war under the British flag), where he arrived on 16 June. He ordered the boat Pasteur, with a cargo of munitions, to be diverted to a British port, which caused some members of the French Government to call for him to be put on trial.

On the afternoon of Sunday 16 June, de Gaulle was at 10 Downing Street for talks about Jean Monnet's mooted Anglo-French political union. He telephoned Reynaud – they were cut off during the conversation and had to resume later – with the news that the British had agreed. He took off from London on a British aircraft at 18:30 on 16 June (it is unclear whether, as was later claimed, he and Churchill agreed that he would be returning soon), landing at Bordeaux at around 22:00 to be told that he was no longer a minister, as Reynaud had resigned as prime minister after the Franco-British Union had been rejected by his cabinet. Pétain had become prime minister with a remit of seeking an armistice with Nazi Germany. De Gaulle was now in imminent danger of arrest.

Flight with Edward Spears 
De Gaulle visited Reynaud, who still hoped to escape to French North Africa and declined to come to London. Reynaud still had control of secret government funds until the handover of power the next day. It has been suggested that he ordered de Gaulle to go to London, but no written evidence has ever been found to confirm this. Georges Mandel also refused to come.

At around 09:00 on the morning of 17 June, de Gaulle flew to London on a British aircraft with Edward Spears. The escape was hair-raising. Spears claimed that de Gaulle had been reluctant to come, and that he had pulled him into the aircraft at the last minute, although de Gaulle's biographer does not accept this. Jean Laurent brought 100,000 gold francs in secret funds provided to him by Reynaud. De Gaulle later told André Malraux of the mental anguish which his flight to London – a break with the French Army and with the recognised government, which would inevitably be seen as treason by many – had caused him.

Second World War: leader of the Free French in exile

Appeal from London 

De Gaulle landed at Heston Airport soon after 12:30 on 17 June 1940. He saw Churchill at around 15:00 and Churchill offered him broadcast time on BBC. They both knew about Pétain's broadcast earlier that day that stated that "the fighting must end" and that he had approached the Germans for terms. That evening de Gaulle dined with Jean Monnet and denounced Pétain's "treason". The next day the British Cabinet (Churchill was not present, as it was the day of his "Finest Hour" speech) were reluctant to agree to de Gaulle giving a radio address, as Britain was still in communication with the Pétain government about the fate of the French fleet. Duff Cooper (Minister of Information) had an advance copy of the text of the address, to which there were no objections. The cabinet eventually agreed after individual lobbying, as indicated by a handwritten amendment to the cabinet minutes.

De Gaulle's Appeal of 18 June exhorted the French people not to be demoralized and to continue to resist the occupation of France. He also – apparently on his own initiative – declared that he would broadcast again the next day. Few listened to the 18 June speech; the speech was published in some newspapers in metropolitan (mainland) France. It was largely aimed at French soldiers who were then in Britain after being evacuated from Norway and Dunkirk; most showed no interest in fighting for de Gaulle's Free French Forces and were repatriated back to France to become German prisoners of war.

In his next speech, intended for 19 June, de Gaulle denied the legitimacy of the government at Bordeaux. He called on the North African troops to live up to the tradition of Bertrand Clausel, Thomas Robert Bugeaud, and Hubert Lyautey by defying orders from Bordeaux. The British Foreign Office protested to Churchill, and it was not actually broadcast although appearing in de Gaulle's collection of his speeches. Britain still hoped that the new French government would cooperate, and did not want to publicly support a possible alternative whom Alexander Cadogan described as a "crank".

The 18 June speech invited French soldiers and civilians to join de Gaulle. Although the French embassy did not release his address, some found de Gaulle at his borrowed apartment. The general told one visitor "We are starting from zero" as he had no men, money, or premises. The visitor could help, de Gaulle said, by staying while he went to lunch so that someone would be there to answer the phone or door.

De Gaulle also tried, largely in vain, to attract the support of French forces in the French Empire. He telegraphed to General Charles Noguès (Resident-General in Morocco and Commander-in-Chief of French forces in North Africa), offering to serve under him or to cooperate in any way. Noguès, who was dismayed by the armistice but agreed to go along with it, refused to cooperate and forbade the press in French North Africa to publish de Gaulle's appeal. Noguès told the British liaison officer that de Gaulle's attitude was "unseemly". De Gaulle also sent a telegram to Weygand offering to serve under his orders, receiving a dismissive reply.

In the US, the France Forever organization was founded.

After the armistice was signed on 21 June 1940, de Gaulle spoke at 20:00 on 22 June to denounce it. The Bordeaux government reacted immediately, annulling his temporary promotion to brigadier-general with effect from the same day, and forcibly retiring him from the French Army (with the rank of colonel) on 23 June "as a disciplinary measure" (par mesure de discipline). On 23 June the British Government denounced the armistice as a breach of the Anglo-French treaty signed in March, and stated that they no longer regarded the Bordeaux Government as a fully independent state. They also "took note" of the plan to establish a French National Committee (FNC) in exile, but did not mention de Gaulle by name. Jean Monnet, Chairman of the Anglo-French Coordinating Committee, believed de Gaulle could not yet claim that he alone represented fighting France, and that French opinion would not rally to a man operating from British soil. He said this in a letter to de Gaulle on June 23, and noted he had made his concerns known to British Foreign Office officials Cadogan and Robert Vansittart, as well as Edward Spears. Monnet soon resigned as Chairman of the Anglo-French Coordinating Committee, and departed for the US to continue his work securing supplies from North America (now with the British Purchasing Commission.)

Leader of the Free French 
The armistice took effect from 00:35 on 25 June. Alexander Cadogan of the Foreign Office sent Gladwyn Jebb, then a fairly junior official, to ask de Gaulle to tone down his next broadcast on 26 June; de Gaulle backed down under protest when Jebb told him that he would otherwise be banned from broadcasting. He claimed erroneously that the French fleet was to be handed over to the Germans. On 26 June de Gaulle wrote to Churchill demanding recognition of his French Committee. On 28 June, after Churchill's envoys had failed to establish contact with the French leaders in North Africa, the British Government recognised de Gaulle as leader of the Free French, despite the reservations of Halifax and Cadogan at the Foreign Office. Cadogan later wrote that de Gaulle was "that c*** of a fellow", but other Foreign Office figures Robert Vansittart and Oliver Harvey were quite sympathetic, as was The Times which gave de Gaulle plenty of coverage.

De Gaulle had little success in attracting the support of major figures. Ambassador Charles Corbin, who had strongly supported the mooted Anglo-French Union on 16 June, resigned from the French Foreign Office but retired to South America. Alexis Leger, Secretary-General at the Quai d'Orsay (who hated Reynaud for sacking him) came to London but went on to the US. Roland de Margerie stayed in France despite his opposition to the armistice. De Gaulle received support from Captain Tissier and André Dewavrin (both of whom had been fighting in Norway prior to joining the Free French), Gaston Palewski, Maurice Schumann, and the jurist René Cassin.

Pétain's government was recognised by the US, the USSR, and the Papacy, and controlled the French fleet and the forces in almost all her colonies. At this time de Gaulle's followers consisted of a secretary of limited competence, three colonels, a dozen captains, a famous law professor (Cassin), and three battalions of legionnaires who had agreed to stay in Britain and fight for him. For a time the New Hebrides were the only French colony to back de Gaulle. On 30 June 1940 Admiral Muselier joined the Free French.

De Gaulle initially reacted angrily to news of the Royal Navy's attack on the French fleet (3 July); Pétain and others wrongly blamed him for provoking it by his 26 June speech (in fact it had been planned at least as early as 16 June). He considered withdrawing to Canada to live as a private citizen and waited five days before broadcasting. Spears called on de Gaulle on 5 July and found him "astonishingly objective" and acknowledging that it was the right thing from the British point of view. Spears reported to Churchill that de Gaulle had shown "a splendid dignity". In his broadcast of 8 July he spoke of the "pain and anger" caused by the attack and that it was a "hateful tragedy not a glorious battle", but that one day the enemy would have used the ships against England or the French Empire, and that the defeat of England would mean "bondage forever" for France. "Our two ancient nations...remain bound to one another. They will either go down both together or both together they will win".

On Bastille Day (14 July) 1940 de Gaulle led a group of between 200 and 300 sailors to lay a wreath at the statue of Ferdinand Foch at Grosvenor Gardens. A mass of anonymous flowers were left on his mother's grave on 16 July 1940, suggesting he was not without admirers in France.

From 22 July 1940 de Gaulle used 4 Carlton Gardens in central London as his London headquarters. His family had left Brittany (the other ship which left at the same time was sunk) and lived for a time at Petts Wood. As his daughter Anne was terrified by the Blitz they moved to Ellesmere in Shropshire, a four-hour journey from London and where de Gaulle was only able to visit them once a month. His wife and daughter also lived for a time in the country at Rodinghead House, Little Gaddesden, in Hertfordshire, 45 kilometres (28 miles) from central London. De Gaulle lived at the Connaught Hotel in London, then from 1942 to 1944 he lived in Hampstead, North London.

The small audience of the 18 June appeal grew for later speeches, and the press by early August described Free French military as fighting under de Gaulle's command, although few in France knew anything about him. (When he returned to France after liberation, people sometimes greeted another, more senior officer with him as de Gaulle, believing that he must be a five-star general.) Many thought that "Degaule", "Dugaul", or "Gaul" was a nom de guerre, disbelieving that the mysterious general describing himself as the nation's liberator was called the ancient name of France. Agnès Humbert, who had heard the 18 June speech, wrote in her diary of distributing pamphlets supporting de Gaulle's cause, despite his being

The Vichy regime had already sentenced de Gaulle to four years' imprisonment; on 2 August 1940 he was condemned to death by court martial in absentia, although Pétain commented that he would ensure that the sentence was never carried out. De Gaulle said of the sentence, "I consider the act of the Vichy men as void; I shall have an explanation with them after the victory". He and Churchill reached agreement on 7 August 1940, that Britain would fund the Free French, with the bill to be settled after the war (the financial agreement was finalised in March 1941). A separate letter guaranteed the territorial integrity of the French Empire.

General Georges Catroux, Governor of French Indo-China (which was increasingly coming under Japan's thumb), disapproved of the armistice and congratulated de Gaulle, whom he had known for many years. He was sacked by Vichy and arrived in London on 31 August; de Gaulle had gone to Dakar, but they met in Chad four weeks later. He was the most senior military figure to defect to the Free French.

De Gaulle's support grew out of a base in the colonial French Equatorial Africa. In the fall of 1940, the colonial empire largely supported the Vichy regime. Félix Éboué, governor of Chad, switched his support to General de Gaulle in September. Encouraged, de Gaulle traveled to Brazzaville in October, where he announced the formation of an Empire Defense Council in his "Brazzaville Manifesto", and invited all colonies still supporting Vichy to join him and the Free French forces in the fight against Germany, which most of them did by 1943.

In October 1940, after talks between the Foreign Office and Louis Rougier, de Gaulle was asked to tone down his attacks on Pétain. On average he spoke on BBC radio three times a month.

De Gaulle established the Order of Liberation in Brazzaville in November 1940.

De Gaulle and Pétain: rival visions of France 
Prime Minister Pétain moved the government to Vichy (2 July) and had the National Assembly (10 July) vote to dissolve itself and give him dictatorial powers, making the beginning of his Révolution nationale (National Revolution) intended to "reorient" French society. This was the dawn of the Vichy regime.

De Gaulle's subsequent speeches reached many parts of the territories under the Vichy regime, helping to rally the French resistance movement and earning him much popularity amongst the French people and soldiers. The British historian Christopher Flood noted that there were major differences between the speeches of de Gaulle and Pétain, which reflected their views on themselves and of France. Pétain always used the personal pronoun je, portrayed himself as both a Christ-like figure sacrificing himself for France while also assuming a God-like tone of a semi-omniscient narrator who knew truths about the world that the rest of the French did not. De Gaulle began by making frequent use of "I" and "me" in his war-time speeches, but over time, their use declined. Unlike Pétain, de Gaulle never invoked quasi-religious imagery to enhance his prestige. De Gaulle always mentioned Pétain by name whereas Pétain never mentioned de Gaulle directly, referring to him as the "faux ami" ("false friend").

Pétain exonerated the French military of responsibility for the defeat of 1940 which he blamed on the moral decline of French society (thus making his Révolution nationale necessary) while de Gaulle blamed the military chiefs while exonerating French society for the defeat (thus suggesting that French society was nowhere near as rotten as Pétain claimed, making the Révolution nationale unnecessary). Pétain claimed that France had "stupidly" declared war on Germany in 1939 at British prompting while de Gaulle spoke of the entire era since 1914 as "la guerre de trente ans" ("the thirty years' war"), arguing the two world wars were really one with a long truce in between. The only historical figure Pétain invoked was Joan of Arc as a model of self-sacrificing French patriotism in the "eternal struggle" against England whereas de Gaulle invoked virtually every major French historical figure from the ancient Gauls to World War I. De Gaulle's willingness to invoke historical figures from before and after 1789 was meant to suggest that his France was an inclusive France where there was room for both left and right, in contrast to Pétain's demand for national unity under his leadership. Most significantly, Pétain's speeches always stressed the need for France to withdraw from a hostile and threatening world to find unity. By contrast, de Gaulle's speeches, while praising the greatness of France, lacked Pétain's implicit xenophobia; the fight for a free, democratic and inclusive France was always portrayed as part of a wider worldwide struggle for world freedom, where France would be an anchor for a new democratic order.

De Gaulle spoke more of "the Republic" than of "democracy"; before his death René Cassin claimed that he had "succeeded in turning de Gaulle towards democracy". However, claims that de Gaulle was surrounded by Cagoulards, Royalists and other right-wing extremists are untrue. Some of André Dewavrin's closest colleagues were Cagoulards, although Dewavrin always denied that he himself was. Many leading figures of the Free French and the Resistance, e.g., Jean Moulin and Pierre Brossolette, were on the political left. By the end of 1940 de Gaulle was beginning to be recognised as the leader of the Resistance, a position cemented after Jean Moulin's visit to London in autumn 1941. In the summer of 1941 the BBC set aside five minutes per day (later increased to ten) for the Free French, with Maurice Schumann as the main spokesman, and eventually there was a programme "Les Francais parlent aux Francais". A newspaper France was also soon set up.

De Gaulle organised the Free French Forces and the Allies gave increasing support and recognition to de Gaulle's efforts. In London in September 1941 de Gaulle formed the French National Committee, with himself as president. It was an all-encompassing coalition of resistance forces, ranging from conservative Catholics like himself to communists. By early 1942, the "Fighting French" movement, as it was now called, gained rapidly in power and influence; it overcame Vichy in Syria and Lebanon, adding to its base. Dealing with the French communists was a delicate issue, for they were under Moscow's control and the USSR was friendly with Germany in 1940–41 as a result of the Molotov–Ribbentrop Pact. They came into the Free French movement only when Germany invaded Russia in June 1941. De Gaulle's policy then became one of friendship directly with Moscow, but Stalin showed little interest. In 1942, de Gaulle created the Normandie-Niemen squadron, a Free French Air Force regiment, in order to fight on the Eastern Front. It is the only Western allied formation to have fought until the end of the war in the East.

De Gaulle's relations with "les Anglo-Saxons" 

In his dealings with the British and Americans (both referred to as the "Anglo-Saxons", in de Gaulle's parlance), he always insisted on retaining full freedom of action on behalf of France and was constantly on the verge of losing the Allies' support. Some writers have sought to deny that there was deep and mutual antipathy between de Gaulle and British and American political leaders.

De Gaulle personally had ambivalent feelings about Britain, possibly in part because of childhood memories of the Fashoda Incident. As an adult he spoke German much better than he spoke English. He had a multilingual translator and driver, Olivia Jordan, from 1940 to 1943.  He had thought little of the British Army's contribution to the First World War, and even less of that of 1939–40, and in the 1930s he had been a reader of the journal Action Française which blamed Britain for German foreign policy gains at France's expense. De Gaulle explained his position:

In addition, de Gaulle harboured a suspicion of the British in particular, believing that they were seeking to seize France's colonial possessions in the Levant. Winston Churchill was often frustrated at what he perceived as de Gaulle's patriotic arrogance, but also wrote of his "immense admiration" for him during the early days of his British exile. Although their relationship later became strained, Churchill tried to explain the reasons for de Gaulle's behaviour in the second volume of his history of World War II:

De Gaulle described his adversarial relationship with Churchill in these words: "When I am right, I get angry. Churchill gets angry when he is wrong. We are angry at each other much of the time." On one occasion in 1941 Churchill spoke to him on the telephone. De Gaulle said that the French people thought he was a reincarnation of Joan of Arc, to which Churchill replied that the English had had to burn the last one. Clementine Churchill, who admired de Gaulle, once cautioned him, "General, you must not hate your friends more than you hate your enemies." De Gaulle himself stated famously, "No Nation has friends, only interests."

After his initial support, Churchill, emboldened by American antipathy to the French general, urged his War Cabinet to remove de Gaulle as leader of the Free France. But the War Cabinet warned Churchill that a precipitate break with de Gaulle would have a disastrous effect on the whole resistance movement. By autumn 1943, Churchill had to acknowledge that de Gaulle had won the struggle for leadership of Free France.

De Gaulle's relations with Washington were even more strained. President Roosevelt for a long time refused to recognize de Gaulle as the representative of France, insisting on negotiations with the Vichy government. Roosevelt in particular hoped that it would be possible to wean Pétain away from Germany. Roosevelt maintained recognition of the Vichy regime until late 1942, and saw de Gaulle as an impudent representative of a minority interest.

After 1942, Roosevelt championed General Henri Giraud, more compliant with US interests than de Gaulle, as the leader of the Free France. At the Casablanca Conference (1943), Roosevelt forced de Gaulle to cooperate with Giraud, but de Gaulle was considered as the undisputed leader of the Resistance by the French people and Giraud was progressively deprived of his political and military roles. The British and Soviet governments urged Roosevelt to recognise de Gaulle's provisional government, but Roosevelt delayed doing so as long as possible and even recognised the Italian provisional government before the French one. British and Soviet allies were outraged that the US president unilaterally recognised the new government of a former enemy before de Gaulle's one and both recognised the French government in retaliation, forcing Roosevelt to recognise de Gaulle in late 1944, but Roosevelt managed to exclude de Gaulle from the Yalta Conference. Roosevelt eventually abandoned his plans to rule France as an occupied territory and to transfer French Indochina to the United Nations.

Plane sabotage 
On 21 April 1943, de Gaulle was scheduled to fly in a Wellington bomber to Scotland to inspect the Free French Navy. On take-off, the bomber's tail dropped, and the plane nearly crashed into the airfield's embankment. Only the skill of the pilot, who became aware of sabotage on takeoff, saved them. On inspection, it was found that aeroplane's separator rod had been sabotaged, using acid. Britain's MI6 investigated the incident, but no one was ever apprehended. Publicly, blame for the incident was cast on German intelligence; however, behind closed doors de Gaulle blamed the Western Allies, and later told colleagues that he no longer had confidence in them.

Algiers 

Working with the French Resistance and other supporters in France's colonial African possessions after Operation Torch in November 1942, de Gaulle moved his headquarters to Algiers in May 1943, leaving Britain to be on French territory. He became first joint head (with the less resolutely independent General Henri Giraud, the candidate preferred by the US who wrongly suspected de Gaulle of being a British puppet) and then—after squeezing out Giraud by force of personality—sole chairman of the French Committee of National Liberation.

De Gaulle was held in high regard by Allied commander General Dwight Eisenhower. In Algiers in 1943, Eisenhower gave de Gaulle the assurance in person that a French force would liberate Paris and arranged that the army division of French General Philippe Leclerc de Hauteclocque would be transferred from North Africa to the UK to carry out that liberation. Eisenhower was impressed by the combativeness of units of the Free French Forces and "grateful for the part they had played in mopping up the remnants of German resistance"; he also detected how strongly devoted many were to de Gaulle and how ready they were to accept him as the national leader.

Preparations for D-Day 
As preparations for the liberation of Europe gathered pace, the US in particular found de Gaulle's tendency to view everything from the French perspective to be extremely tiresome. Roosevelt, who refused to recognize any provisional authority in France until elections had been held, referred to de Gaulle as "an apprentice dictator", a view backed by a number of leading Frenchmen in Washington, including Jean Monnet, who later became an instrumental figure in the setting up of the European Coal and Steel Community that led to the modern European Union. Roosevelt directed Churchill to not provide de Gaulle with strategic details of the imminent invasion because he did not trust him to keep the information to himself. French codes were considered weak, posing a risk since the Free French refused to use British or American codes. De Gaulle refused to share coded information with the British, who were then obliged secretly to break the codes to read French messages.

Nevertheless, a few days before D-Day, Churchill, whose relationship with the General had deteriorated since he arrived in Britain, decided he needed to keep him informed of developments, and on 2 June he sent two passenger aircraft and his representative, Duff Cooper, to Algiers to bring de Gaulle back to Britain. De Gaulle refused because of Roosevelt's intention to install a provisional Allied military government in the former occupied territories pending elections, but he eventually relented and flew to Britain the next day.

Upon his arrival at RAF Northolt on 4 June 1944 he received an official welcome, and a letter reading "My dear general! Welcome to these shores, very great military events are about to take place!" Later, on his personal train, Churchill informed him that he wanted him to make a radio address, but when informed that the Americans continued to refuse to recognise his right to power in France, and after Churchill suggested he request a meeting with Roosevelt to improve his relationship with the president, de Gaulle became angry, demanding to know why he should "lodge my candidacy for power in France with Roosevelt; the French government exists".

De Gaulle became worried that the German withdrawal from France might lead to a breakdown of law and order in the country and even a possible communist takeover. During the general conversation which followed with those present, de Gaulle was involved in an angry exchange with the Labour minister, Ernest Bevin, and, raising his concerns about the validity of the new currency to be circulated by the Allies after the liberation, de Gaulle commented scornfully, "go and wage war with your false money". De Gaulle was very concerned that an American takeover of the French administration would just provoke a communist uprising.

Churchill then lost his temper, saying that Britain would always be an ally to the United States, and that under the circumstances, if they had to choose between France and the US, Britain would always choose the latter. De Gaulle replied that he realised this would always be the case. The next day, de Gaulle refused to address the French nation as the script again made no mention of his being the legitimate interim ruler of France. It instructed the French people to obey Allied military authorities until elections could be held, and so the row continued, with de Gaulle calling Churchill a "gangster". Churchill accused de Gaulle of treason in the height of battle, and demanded that he be flown back to Algiers "in chains if necessary".

De Gaulle and Churchill had a complex relationship during the wartime period. De Gaulle did show respect and admiration for Churchill, and even some light humorous interactions between the two have been noted by observers such as Duff Cooper, the British Ambassador to the French Committee of Liberation. Churchill explained his support for de Gaulle during the darkest hours, calling him "L'homme du destin".

In Casablanca in 1943, Churchill supported de Gaulle as the embodiment of a French Army that was otherwise defeated, stating that "De Gaulle is the spirit of that Army. Perhaps the last survivor of a warrior race." Churchill supported de Gaulle as he had been one of the first major French leaders to reject Nazi German rule outright, stating in August 1944 that "I have never forgotten, and can never forget, that he [de Gaulle] stood forth as the first eminent Frenchman to face the common foe in what seemed to be the hour of ruin of his country and possibly, of ours."

In the years to come, the sometimes hostile, sometimes friendly dependent wartime relationship of de Gaulle and his future political peers reenacted the historical national and colonial rivalry and lasting enmity between the French and the British, and foreshadowed the deep distrust of France for post-war Anglo-American partnerships.

Return to France 
De Gaulle ignored les Anglo-Saxons, and proclaimed the authority of Free France over the metropolitan territory the next day. Under the leadership of General de Lattre de Tassigny, France fielded an entire army – a joint force of Free French together with French colonial troops from North Africa – on the Western Front. Initially landing as part of Operation Dragoon, in the south of France, the French First Army helped to liberate almost one third of the country and participated in the invasion and occupation of Germany. As the invasion slowly progressed and the Germans were pushed back, de Gaulle made preparations to return to France.

On 14 June 1944, he left Britain for France for what was supposed to be a one-day trip. Despite an agreement that he would take only two staff, he was accompanied by a large entourage with extensive luggage, and although many rural Normans remained mistrustful of him, he was warmly greeted by the inhabitants of the towns he visited, such as the badly damaged Isigny. Finally he arrived at the city of Bayeux, which he now proclaimed as the capital of Free France. Appointing his Aide-de-Camp Francois Coulet as head of the civil administration, de Gaulle returned to the UK that same night on a French destroyer, and although the official position of the supreme military command remained unchanged, local Allied officers found it more practical to deal with the fledgling administration in Bayeux in everyday matters. De Gaulle flew to Algiers on 16 June and then went on to Rome to meet the Pope and the new Italian government. At the beginning of July he at last visited Roosevelt in Washington, where he received the 17-gun salute of a senior military leader rather than the 21 guns of a visiting head of state. The visit was 'devoid of trust on both sides' according to the French representative, however, Roosevelt did make some concessions towards recognising the legitimacy of the Bayeux administration.

Meanwhile, with the Germans retreating in the face of the Allied onslaught, harried all the way by the resistance, there were widespread instances of revenge attacks on those accused of collaboration. A number of prominent officials and members of the feared Milice were murdered, often by exceptionally brutal means, provoking the Germans into appalling reprisals, such as in the destruction of the village of Oradour-sur-Glane and the killing of its 642 inhabitants.

Liberation of the French capital was not high on the Allies' list of priorities as it had comparatively little strategic value, but both de Gaulle and the commander of the French 2nd Armored Division, General Philippe Leclerc were still extremely concerned about a communist takeover. De Gaulle successfully lobbied for Paris to be made a priority for liberation on humanitarian grounds and obtained from Allied Supreme Commander General Dwight D. Eisenhower an agreement that French troops would be allowed to enter the capital first. A few days later, General Leclerc's division entered the outskirts of the city, and after six days of fighting in which the resistance played a major part, the German garrison of 5000 men surrendered on 25 August, although some sporadic outbreaks of fighting continued for several days. General Dietrich von Choltitz, the commander of the garrison, was instructed by Adolf Hitler to raze the city to the ground, however, he simply ignored the order and surrendered his forces.

It was fortunate for de Gaulle that the Germans had forcibly removed members of the Vichy government and taken them to Germany a few days earlier on 20 August; it allowed him to enter Paris as a liberator in the midst of the general euphoria, but there were serious concerns that communist elements of the resistance, which had done so much to clear the way for the military, would try to seize the opportunity to proclaim their own 'Peoples' Government' in the capital. De Gaulle made contact with Leclerc and demanded the presence of the 2nd Armoured Division to accompany him on a massed parade down the Champs-Élysées, "as much for prestige as for security". This was in spite of the fact that Leclerc's unit was fighting as part of the American 1st Army and were under strict orders to continue their next objective without obeying orders from anyone else. In the event, the American General Omar Bradley decided that Leclerc's division would be indispensable for the maintenance of order and the liquidation of the last pockets of resistance in the French capital. Earlier, on 21 August, de Gaulle had appointed his military advisor General Marie-Pierre Koenig as Governor of Paris.

As his procession came along the Place de la Concorde on Saturday 26 August, it came under machine gun fire by Vichy militia and fifth columnists. Later, on entering the Notre Dame Cathedral to be received as head of the provisional government by the Committee of Liberation, loud shots broke out again, and Leclerc and Koenig tried to hustle him through the door, but de Gaulle shook off their hands and never faltered. While the battle began outside, he walked slowly down the aisle. Before he had gone far a machine pistol fired down from above, at least two more joined in, and from below the FFI and police fired back. A BBC correspondent who was present reported;

De Gaulle himself though wrote, "There were no bullets whistling around my ears." (Aucune balle ne siffle à mes oreilles.) He thought the shots were probably over-excited troops firing at shadows. No culprits, if there were any, were ever identified.

Later, in the great hall of the Hôtel de Ville, de Gaulle was greeted by a jubilant crowd and, proclaiming the continuity of the Third Republic, delivered a famous proclamation;

That evening, the Wehrmacht launched a massive aerial and artillery barrage of Paris in revenge, leaving several thousand dead or injured. The situation in Paris remained tense, and a few days later de Gaulle, still unsure of the trend of events asked General Eisenhower to send some American troops into Paris as a show of strength. This he did 'not without some satisfaction', and so, on 29 August, the US 28th Infantry Division was rerouted from its journey to the front line and paraded down the Champs Elysees.

The same day, Washington and London agreed to accept the position of the Free French. The following day General Eisenhower gave his de facto blessing with a visit to the General in Paris.

1944–1946: Provisional Government of Liberated France 
Roosevelt insisted that an Allied Military Government for Occupied Territories (AMGOT) should be implemented in France, but this was opposed by both the Secretary of War and the Under-Secretary for War, as well as by Eisenhower, who had been strongly opposed to the imposition of AMGOT in North Africa. Eisenhower, unlike Roosevelt, wanted to cooperate with de Gaulle, and he secured a last-minute promise from the President on the eve of D-Day that the Allied officers would not act as military governors and would instead cooperate with the local authorities as the Allied forces liberated French Territory. De Gaulle would later claim in his memoirs that he blocked AMGOT.

With the prewar parties and most of their leaders discredited, there was little opposition to de Gaulle and his associates forming an interim administration. In order not to be seen as presuming on his position in such austere times, de Gaulle did not use one of the grand official residences such as Hotel de Matignon or the presidential palace on the Elysee, but resided briefly in his old office at the War Ministry. When he was joined by his wife and daughters a short while later, they moved into a small state-owned villa on edge of Bois de Boulogne which had once been set aside for Hermann Göring.

Living conditions immediately after the liberation were even worse than under German rule. About 25% of the city was in ruins and public services and fuel were almost nonexistent. Large-scale public demonstrations erupted all over France, protesting the apparent lack of action at improving the supply of food, while in Normandy, bakeries were pillaged. The problem was not French agriculture, which had largely continued operating without problems, but the near-total breakdown of the country's infrastructure. Large areas of track had been destroyed by bombing, most modern equipment, rolling stock, lorries and farm animals had been taken to Germany and all the bridges over the Seine, the Loire and the Rhone between Paris and the sea had been destroyed. The black market pushed real prices to four times the level of 1939, causing the government to print money to try to improve the money supply, which only added to inflation.

On 10 November 1944, Churchill flew to Paris to a reception by de Gaulle and the two together were greeted by thousands of cheering Parisians on the next day. Harold Nicolson stated that Anthony Eden told him that "not for one moment did Winston stop crying, and that he could have filled buckets by the time he received the Freedom of Paris." He said "they yelled for Churchill in a way that he has never heard any crowd yell before." At an official luncheon, de Gaulle said, "It is true that we would not have seen [the liberation] if our old and gallant ally England, and all the British dominions under precisely the impulsion and inspiration of those we are honouring today, had not deployed the extraordinary determination to win, and that magnificent courage which saved the freedom of the world. There is no French man or woman who is not touched to the depths of their hearts and souls by this."

Curbing the Communist Resistance 
After the celebrations had died down, de Gaulle began conferring with leading Resistance figures who, with the Germans gone, intended to continue as a political and military force, and asked to be given a government building to serve as their headquarters. The Resistance, in which the Communists were competing with other trends for leadership, had developed its own manifesto for social and political change known as the National Council of the Resistance (CNR) Charter, and wanted special status to enter the army under their own flags, ranks and honours. Despite their decisive support in backing him against Giraud, de Gaulle disappointed some of the Resistance leaders by telling them that although their efforts and sacrifices had been recognised, they had no further role to play and, that unless they joined the regular army, they should lay down their arms and return to civilian life.

Believing them to be a dangerous revolutionary force, de Gaulle moved to break up the liberation committees and other militias. The communists were not only extremely active, but they received a level of popular support that disturbed de Gaulle. As early as May 1943, the US Secretary of State Cordell Hull had written to Roosevelt urging him to take action to attempt to curb the rise of communism in France.

Provisional Government of the French Republic 

On 10 September 1944 the Provisional Government of the French Republic, or Government of National Unanimity, formed. It included many of de Gaulle's Free French associates such as Gaston Palewski, Claude Guy, Claude Mauriac and Jacques Soustelle, together with members of the main parties, which included the Socialists and a new Christian Democratic Party, the MRP under the leadership of Georges Bidault, who served as Foreign Minister. The president of the prewar Senate Jules Jeanneney was brought back as second-ranking member, but because of their links with Russia, de Gaulle allowed the Communists only two minor positions in his government. While they were now a major political force with over a million members, of the full cabinet of 22 men, only Augustin Laurent and Charles Tillon—who as head of Francs-Tireurs et Partisans had been one of the most active members of the resistance—were given ministries. However, de Gaulle did pardon the Communists' leader Maurice Thorez, who had been sentenced to death in absentia by the French government for desertion. On his return home from Russia, Thorez delivered a speech supporting de Gaulle in which he said that for the present, the war against Germany was the only task that mattered.

There were also a number of new faces in the government, including a literary academic, Georges Pompidou, who had written to one of de Gaulle's recruiting agents offering his services, and Jean Monnet, who in spite of his past opposition to the General now recognized the need for unity and served as Commissioner for Economic Planning. Of equal rank to ministers and answerable only to the prime minister, a number of Commissioners of the Republic (Commissaires de la République) were appointed to re-establish the democratic institutions of France and to extend the legitimacy of the provisional government. A number of former Free French associates served as commissioners, including Henri Fréville, Raymond Aubrac and Michel Debré, who was charged with reforming the civil service. Controversially, de Gaulle also appointed Maurice Papon as Commissioner for Aquitaine in spite of his involvement in the deportation of Jews while serving as a senior police official in the Vichy regime during the occupation. (Over the years, Papon remained in high official positions but continued to be implicated in controversial events such as the Paris massacre of 1961, eventually being convicted of crimes against humanity in 1998.)

In social policy, legislation was introduced in February 1945 that provided for the establishment of works committees in all private industrial establishments employing more than 50 (originally more than 100) people.

Tour of major cities 
De Gaulle's policy was to postpone elections as long as 2.6 million French were in Germany as prisoners of war and forced laborers. In mid-September, he embarked upon a tour of major provincial cities to increase his public profile and to help cement his position. Although he received a largely positive reception from the crowds who came out to see him, he reflected that only a few months previously the very same people had come out to cheer Marshal Pétain when he was serving the Vichy regime. Raymond Aubrac said that the General showed himself to be ill-at-ease at social functions; in Marseille and Lyon he became irate when he had to sit next to former Resistance leaders and also voiced his distaste for the rowdy, libidinous behavior of French youths during the Maquisard parades which preceded his speech. When he reached Toulouse, de Gaulle also had to confront the leaders of a group which had proclaimed themselves to be the provincial government of the city.

During the tour, de Gaulle showed his customary lack of concern for his own safety by mixing with the crowds and thus making himself an easy target for an assassin. Although he was naturally shy, the good use of amplification and patriotic music enabled him to deliver his message that though all of France was fragmented and suffering, together they would rise again. During every speech he would stop halfway through to invite the crowd to join him in singing La Marseillaise, before continuing and finishing by raising his hands in the air and crying "Vive la France!"

Legal purges (Épuration légale) 
As the war entered the final stages, the nation was forced to confront the reality of how many of its people had behaved under German rule. In France, collaborators were more severely punished than in most other occupied countries. Immediately after the liberation, countless women accused of aiding, abetting, and taking German soldiers as lovers were subjected to public humiliations such as being shaved bald and paraded through the streets in their underwear. Many others were simply attacked by lynch mobs. With so many of their former members having been hunted down and killed by the Nazis and paramilitary Milice, the Partisans had already summarily executed an estimated 4,500 people, and the Communists in particular continued to press for severe action against collaborators. In Paris alone, over 150,000 people were at some time detained on suspicion of collaboration, although most were later released. Famous figures accused included the industrialist Louis Renault, the actress Arletty, who had lived openly with a German officer in the Ritz, the opera star Tino Rossi, the chanteuse Édith Piaf, the stage actor Sacha Guitry and Coco Chanel, who was briefly detained but fled to Switzerland.

Keenly aware of the need to seize the initiative and to get the process under firm judicial control, de Gaulle appointed Justice Minister François de Menthon to lead the Legal Purge (Épuration légale) to punish traitors and to clear away the traces of the Vichy regime. Knowing that he would need to reprieve many of the 'economic collaborators'—such as police and civil servants who held minor roles under Vichy in order to keep the country running as normally as possible—he assumed, as head of state, the right to commute death sentences. Of the near 2,000 people who received the death sentence from the courts, fewer than 800 were executed. De Gaulle commuted 998 of the 1,554 capital sentences submitted before him, including all those involving women. Many others were given jail terms or had their voting rights and other legal privileges taken away. It is generally agreed that the purges were conducted arbitrarily, with often absurdly severe or overly lenient punishments being handed down. It was also notable that the less well-off people who were unable to pay for lawyers were more harshly treated. As time went by and feelings grew less intense, a number of people who had held fairly senior positions under the Vichy government—such as Maurice Papon and René Bousquet—escaped consequences by claiming to have worked secretly for the resistance or to have played a double game, working for the good of France by serving the established order.

Later, there was the question of what to do with the former Vichy leaders when they were finally returned to France. Marshal Pétain and Maxime Weygand were war heroes from World War I and were now extremely old; convicted of treason, Pétain received a death sentence which his old protégé de Gaulle commuted to life imprisonment, while Weygand was eventually acquitted. Three Vichy leaders were executed. Joseph Darnand, who became an SS officer and led the Milice paramilitaries who hunted down members of the Resistance, was executed in October 1945. Fernand de Brinon, the third-ranking Vichy official, was found guilty of war crimes and executed in April 1947. The two trials of the most infamous collaborator of all, Pierre Laval, who was heavily implicated in the murder of Jews, were widely criticised as being unfair for depriving him of the opportunity to properly defend himself, although Laval antagonized the court throughout with his bizarre behavior. He was found guilty of treason in May 1945 and de Gaulle was adamant that there would be no commuting the death sentence, saying that Laval's execution was "an indispensable symbolic gesture required for reasons of state". There was a widespread belief, particularly in the years that followed, that de Gaulle was trying to appease both the Third Republic politicians and the former Vichy leaders who had made Laval their scapegoat.

Winter of 1944 
The winter of 194445 was especially difficult for most of the population. Inflation showed no sign of slowing down and food shortages were severe. The prime minister and the other Gaullists were forced to try to balance the desires of ordinary people and public servants for a return to normal life with pressure from Bidault's MRP and the Communists for the large scale nationalisation programme and other social changes that formed the main tenets of the CNR Charter. At the end of 1944 the coal industry and other energy companies were nationalised, followed shortly afterwards by major banks and finance houses, the merchant navy, the main aircraft manufacturers, airlines and a number of major private enterprises such as the Renault car company at Boulogne-Billancourt, whose owner had been implicated as a collaborator and accused of having made huge profits working for the Nazis. In some cases, unions, feeling that things were not progressing quickly enough, took matters into their own hands, occupying premises and setting up workers' committees to run the companies. Women were also allowed the vote for the first time, a new social security system was introduced to cover most medical costs, unions were expanded and price controls introduced to try to curb inflation. At de Gaulle's request, the newspaper Le Monde was founded in December 1944 to provide France with a quality daily journal similar to those in other countries. Le Monde took over the premises and facilities of the older Le Temps, whose independence and reputation had been badly compromised during the Vichy years.

During this period there were a number of minor disagreements between the French and the other Allies. The British ambassador to France Duff Cooper said that de Gaulle seemed to seek out real or imagined insults to take offence at whatever possible. De Gaulle believed Britain and the US were intending to keep their armies in France after the war and were secretly working to take over its overseas possessions and to prevent it from regaining its political and economic strength. In late October he complained that the Allies were failing to adequately arm and equip the new French army and instructed Bidault to use the French veto at the European Council.

On Armistice Day in 1945, Winston Churchill made his first visit to France since the liberation and received a good reception in Paris where he laid a wreath to Georges Clemenceau. The occasion also marked the first official appearance of de Gaulle's wife Yvonne, but the visit was less friendly than it appeared. De Gaulle had instructed that there be no excessive displays of public affection towards Churchill and no official awards without his prior agreement. When crowds cheered Churchill during a parade down the Elysee, de Gaulle was heard to remark, "Fools and cretins! Look at the rabble cheering the old bandit".

Visit to the Soviet Union 
With the Russian forces making more rapid advances into German-held territory than the West, there was a sudden public realisation that the Soviet Union was about to dominate large parts of eastern Europe. In fact, in October 1944, Churchill had reluctantly agreed to allow Bulgaria and Romania, already occupied by the Red Army, and Hungary to fall under the Soviet sphere of influence after the war, with shared influence in Yugoslavia. The UK was to retain hegemony over Greece, although there had been no agreement over Poland, whose eastern territories were already in Soviet hands under the Molotov–Ribbentrop Pact with Germany, and which retained a government in exile in London. De Gaulle had not been invited to any of the 'Big Three' Conferences, although the decisions made by Stalin, Churchill and Roosevelt in dividing up Europe were of huge importance to France.

De Gaulle and his Foreign Minister Bidault stated that they were not in favour of a 'Western Bloc' that would be separate from the rest of Europe, and hoped that a resurgent France might be able to act as a 'third force' in Europe to temper the ambitions of the two emerging superpowers, America and Soviet Union. He began seeking an audience with Stalin to press his 'facing both ways' policy, and finally received an invitation in late 1944. In his memoirs, de Gaulle devoted 24 pages to his visit to the Soviet Union, but a number of writers make the point that his version of events differs significantly from that of the Soviets, of foreign news correspondents, and with their own eyewitness accounts.

De Gaulle wanted access to German coal in the Ruhr as reparations after the war, the left bank of the Rhine to be incorporated into French territory, and for the Oder-Neisse line in Poland to become Germany's official eastern border. De Gaulle began by requesting that France enter into a treaty with the Soviet Union on this basis, but Stalin, who remained in constant contact with Churchill throughout the visit, said that it would be impossible to make such an agreement without the consent of Britain and America. He suggested that it might be possible to add France's name to the existing Anglo-Soviet Agreement if they agreed to recognise the Soviet-backed provisional Polish government known as the Lublin Committee as rightful rulers of Poland, but de Gaulle refused on the grounds that this would be 'un-French', as it would mean it being a junior partner in an alliance. During the visit, de Gaulle accompanied the deputy Soviet leader Vyacheslav Molotov on a tour of the former battleground at Stalingrad, where he was deeply moved at the scene of carnage he witnessed and surprised Molotov by referring to "our joint sacrifice".

Though the treaty which was eventually signed by Bidault and Molotov carried symbolic importance in that it enabled de Gaulle to demonstrate that he was recognised as the official head of state and show that France's voice was being heard abroad, it was of little relevance to Stalin due to France's lack of real political and military power; it did not affect the outcome of the post-war settlement. Stalin later commented that like Churchill and Roosevelt, he found de Gaulle to be awkward and stubborn and believed that he was 'not a complicated person' (by which he meant that he was an old-style nationalist). Stalin also felt that he lacked realism in claiming the same rights as the major powers and did not object to Roosevelt's refusal to allow de Gaulle to attend the 'Big Three' conferences that were to come at Yalta and Potsdam.

Strasbourg 
At the end of 1944 French forces continued to advance as part of the American armies, but during the Ardennes Offensive there was a dispute over Eisenhower's order to French troops to evacuate Strasbourg, which had just been liberated so as to straighten the defensive line against the German counterattack. Strasbourg was an important political and psychological symbol of French sovereignty in Alsace and Lorraine, and de Gaulle, saying that its loss would bring down the government, refused to allow a retreat, predicting that "Strasbourg will be our Stalingrad".

By early 1945 it was clear that the price controls which had been introduced to control inflation had only served to boost the black market and prices continued to move ever upwards. By this time the army had swelled to over 1.2 million men and almost half of state expenditure was going to military spending. De Gaulle was faced with his first major ministerial dispute when the very able but tough-minded economics minister Pierre Mendès France demanded a programme of severe monetary reform which was opposed by the Finance Ministry headed by Aime Lepercq, who favoured a programme of heavy borrowing to stimulate the economy. When de Gaulle, knowing there would be little appetite for further austerity measures sided with Lepercq, Mendès France tendered his resignation, which was rejected because de Gaulle knew he needed him. Lepercq was killed in a road accident a short time afterwards and was succeeded by Pleven, but when in March, Mendès France asked unsuccessfully for taxes on capital earnings and for the blocking of certain bank accounts, he again offered his resignation and it was accepted.

Yalta Conference 

De Gaulle was never invited to the summit conferences of Allied leaders such as Yalta and Potsdam. He never forgave the Big Three leaders (Churchill, Roosevelt and Stalin) for their neglect and continued to rage against it as having been a negative factor in European politics for the rest of his life.

After the Rhine crossings, the French First Army captured a large section of territory in southern Germany, but although this later allowed France to play a part in the signing of the German surrender, Roosevelt in particular refused to allow any discussion about de Gaulle participating in the Big Three conferences that would shape Europe in the post-war world. Churchill pressed hard for France to be included 'at the inter-allied table', but on 6 December 1944 the American president wired both Stalin and Churchill to say that de Gaulle's presence would "merely introduce a complicating and undesirable factor".

At the Yalta Conference in February 1945, despite Stalin's opposition, Churchill and Roosevelt insisted that France be allowed a post-war occupation zone in Germany, and also made sure that it was included among the five nations that invited others to the conference to establish the United Nations. This was important because it guaranteed France a permanent seat on the UN Security Council, a prestigious position that, despite pressure from emerging nations, it still holds today.

President Truman 
On his way back from Yalta, Roosevelt asked de Gaulle to meet him in Algiers for talks. The General refused, believing that there was nothing more to be said, and for this he received a rebuke from Georges Bidault and from the French press, and a severely angered Roosevelt criticised de Gaulle to Congress. Soon after, on 12 April 1945, Roosevelt died, and despite their uneasy relationship de Gaulle declared a week of mourning in France and forwarded an emotional and conciliatory letter to the new American president, Harry S. Truman, in which he said of Roosevelt, "all of France loved him".

De Gaulle's relationship with Truman was to prove just as difficult as it had been with Roosevelt. With Allied forces advancing deep into Germany, another serious situation developed between American and French forces in Stuttgart and Karlsruhe, when French soldiers were ordered to transfer the occupation zones to US troops. Wishing to retain as much German territory in French hands as possible, de Gaulle ordered his troops, who were using American weapons and ammunition, to resist, and an armed confrontation seemed imminent. Truman threatened to cut off supplies to the French army and to take the zones by force, leaving de Gaulle with little choice but to back down. De Gaulle never forgave Truman and hinted he would work closely with Stalin, leading Truman to tell his staff, "I don't like the son of a bitch."

The first visit by de Gaulle to Truman in the U.S. was not a success. Truman told his visitor that it was time that the French got rid of the Communist influence from its government, to which de Gaulle replied that this was France's own business. But Truman, who admitted that his feelings towards the French were becoming "less and less friendly", went on to say that under the circumstances, the French could not expect much economic aid and refused to accept de Gaulle's request for control of the west bank of the Rhine. During the argument which followed, de Gaulle reminded Truman that the US was using the French port of Nouméa in New Caledonia as a base against the Japanese.

Victory in Europe 

In May 1945 the German armies surrendered to the Americans and British at Rheims, and a separate armistice was signed with France in Berlin. De Gaulle refused to allow any British participation in the victory parade in Paris. However, among the vehicles that took part was an ambulance from the Hadfield-Spears Ambulance Unit, staffed by French doctors and British nurses. One of the nurses was Mary Spears, who had set up the unit and had worked almost continuously since the Battle of France with Free French forces in the Middle East, North Africa and Italy. Mary's husband was General Edward Spears, the British liaison to the Free French who had personally spirited de Gaulle to safety in Britain in 1940. When de Gaulle saw the Union Flags and Tricolours side by side on the ambulance, and heard French soldiers cheering, "Voilà Spears! Vive Spears!", he ordered that the unit be closed down immediately and its British staff sent home. A number of French troops returned their medals in protest and Mary wrote, "it is a pitiful business when a great man suddenly becomes small."

Another confrontation with the Americans broke out soon after the armistice when the French sent troops to occupy the French-speaking Italian border region of Val d'Aoste. The French commander threatened to open fire on American troops if they tried to stop them, and an irate Truman ordered the immediate end to all arms shipments to France. Truman sent de Gaulle an angry letter saying that he found it unbelievable that the French could threaten to attack American troops after they had done so much to liberate France.

However, de Gaulle was generally well received in the United States immediately after World War II and supported the United States in public comments. He visited New York City on 27 August 1945 to great welcome by thousands of people of the city and its mayor Fiorello La Guardia. On that day, de Gaulle wished "Long live the United States of America". He visited New York City Hall and Idlewild Airport (now John F. Kennedy International Airport), and presented LaGuardia with the Grand Croix of the Legion of Honour award.

Confrontation in Syria and Lebanon 

On VE Day, there were also serious riots in French Tunisia. A dispute with Britain over control of Syria and Lebanon quickly developed into an unpleasant diplomatic incident that demonstrated France's weaknesses. In April, de Gaulle sent General Beynet to establish an air base in Syria and a naval base in Lebanon, provoking an outbreak of nationalism in which some French nationals were attacked and killed. On 20 May, French artillery and warplanes fired on demonstrators in Damascus. After several days, upwards of 800 Syrians lay dead.

Churchill's relationship with de Gaulle was now at rock bottom. In January he told a colleague that he believed that de Gaulle was "a great danger to peace and for Great Britain. After five years of experience, I am convinced that he is the worst enemy of France in her troubles ... he is one of the greatest dangers to European peace.... I am sure that in the long run no understanding will be reached with General de Gaulle".

On 31 May, Churchill told de Gaulle "immediately to order French troops to cease fire and withdraw to their barracks". British forces moved in and forced the French to withdraw from the city; they were then escorted and confined to barracks. With this political pressure added, the French ordered a ceasefire; De Gaulle raged but France was isolated and suffering a diplomatic humiliation. The secretary of the Arab League Edward Atiyah said, "France put all her cards and two rusty pistols on the table". De Gaulle saw it as a heinous Anglo-Saxon conspiracy: he told the British ambassador Duff Cooper, "I recognise that we are not in a position to wage war against you, but you have betrayed France and betrayed the West. That cannot be forgotten".

Potsdam Conference 
At the Potsdam Conference in July, to which de Gaulle was not invited, a decision was made to divide Vietnam, which had been a French colony for over a hundred years, into British and Chinese spheres of influence. Soon after the surrender of Japan in August 1945, de Gaulle sent the French Far East Expeditionary Corps to re-establish French sovereignty in French Indochina.  However, Ho Chi Minh, leader of the Viet Minh independence movement, declared independence of Vietnam in September, and the First Indochina War broke out that lasted until France was defeated in 1954.

New elections and resignation 
Since the liberation, the only parliament in France had been an enlarged version of the Algiers Provisional Consultative Assembly, and at last, in October 1945, elections were held for a new Constituent Assembly whose main task was to provide a new constitution for the Fourth Republic. De Gaulle favoured a strong executive for the nation, but all three of the main parties wished to severely restrict the powers of the president. The Communists wanted an assembly with full constitutional powers and no time limit, whereas de Gaulle, the Socialists and the Popular Republican Movement (MRP) advocated one with a term limited to only seven months, after which the draft constitution would be submitted for another referendum.

In the election, the second option was approved by 13 million of the 21 million voters. The big three parties won 75% of the vote, with the Communists winning 158 seats, the MRP 152 seats, the Socialists 142 seats and the remaining seats going to the various far right parties.

On 13 November 1945, the new assembly unanimously elected Charles de Gaulle head of the government, but problems immediately arose when it came to selecting the cabinet, due to his unwillingness once more to allow the Communists any important ministries. The Communists, now the largest party and with their charismatic leader Maurice Thorez back at the helm, were not prepared to accept this for a second time, and a furious row ensued, during which de Gaulle sent a letter of resignation to the speaker of the Assembly and declared that he was unwilling to trust a party that he considered to be an agent of a foreign power (Russia) with authority over the police and armed forces of France.

Eventually, the new cabinet was finalised on 21 November, with the Communists receiving five out of the twenty-two ministries, and although they still did not get any of the key portfolios, de Gaulle believed that the draft constitution placed too much power in the hands of parliament with its shifting party alliances. One of his ministers said he was "a man equally incapable of monopolizing power as of sharing it".

De Gaulle outlined a programme of further nationalisations and a new economic plan which were passed, but a further row came when the Communists demanded a 20 percent reduction in the military budget. Refusing to "rule by compromise", de Gaulle once more threatened to resign. There was a general feeling that he was trying to blackmail the assembly into complete subservience by threatening to withdraw his personal prestige which he insisted was what alone kept the ruling coalition together. Although the MRP managed to broker a compromise which saw the budget approved with amendments, it was little more than a stop-gap measure.

Barely two months after forming the new government, de Gaulle abruptly resigned on 20 January 1946. The move was called "a bold and ultimately foolish political ploy", with de Gaulle hoping that as a war hero, he would be soon brought back as a more powerful executive by the French people. However, that did not turn out to be the case. With the war finally over, the initial period of crisis had passed. Although there were still shortages, particularly of bread, France was now on the road to recovery, and de Gaulle suddenly did not seem so indispensable. The Communist publication Combat wrote, "There was no cataclysm, and the empty plate didn't crack".

1946–1958: Out of power 

After monopolizing French politics for six years, Charles de Gaulle suddenly dropped out of sight, and returned to his home in Colombey to write his war memoirs. De Gaulle had told Pierre Bertaux in 1944 that he planned to retire because "France may still one day need an image that is pure ... If Joan of Arc had married, she would no longer have been Joan of Arc". The famous opening paragraph of Mémoires de guerre begins by declaring, "All my life, I have had a certain idea of France (une certaine idée de la France)", comparing his country to an old painting of a Madonna, and ends by declaring that, given the divisive nature of French politics, France cannot truly live up to this ideal without a policy of "grandeur". During this period of formal retirement, however, de Gaulle maintained regular contact with past political lieutenants from wartime and RPF days, including sympathizers involved in political developments in French Algeria, becoming "perhaps the best-informed man in France".

In April 1947, de Gaulle made a renewed attempt to transform the political scene by creating a Rassemblement du Peuple Français (Rally of the French People, or RPF), which he hoped would be able to move above the familiar party squabbles of the parliamentary system. Despite the new party's taking 40 percent of the vote in local elections and 121 seats in 1951, lacking its own press and access to television, its support ebbed away. In May 1953, he withdrew again from active politics, though the RPF lingered until September 1955.

As with all colonial powers France began to lose its overseas possessions amid the surge of nationalism.  French Indochina (now Vietnam, Laos, and Cambodia), colonised by France during the mid-19th century, had been lost to the Japanese after the defeat of 1940. De Gaulle had intended to hold on to France's Indochina colony, ordering the parachuting of French agents and arms into Indochina in late 1944 and early 1945 with orders to attack the Japanese as American troops hit the beaches. Although de Gaulle had moved quickly to consolidate French control of the territory during his brief first tenure as president in the 1940s, the communist Vietminh under Ho Chi Minh began a determined campaign for independence from 1946 onwards. The French fought a bitter seven-year war (the First Indochina War) to hold on to Indochina. It was largely funded by the United States and grew increasingly unpopular, especially after the stunning defeat at the Battle of Dien Bien Phu. France pulled out that summer under Prime Minister Pierre Mendès France.

The independence of Morocco and Tunisia was arranged by Mendès France and proclaimed in March 1956. Meanwhile, in Algeria some 350,000 French troops were fighting 150,000 combatants of the Algerian Liberation Movement (FLN). Within a few years, the Algerian war of independence reached a summit in terms of savagery and bloodshed and threatened to spill into metropolitan France itself.

Between 1946 and 1958 the Fourth Republic had 24 separate ministries. Frustrated by the endless divisiveness, de Gaulle famously asked "How can you govern a country which has 246 varieties of cheese?"

1958: Collapse of the Fourth Republic 

The Fourth Republic was wracked by political instability, failures in Indochina, and inability to resolve the Algerian question.

On 13 May 1958, the Pied-Noir settlers seized the government buildings in Algiers, attacking what they saw as French government weakness in the face of demands among the Berber and Arab majority for Algerian independence. A "Committee of Civil and Army Public Security" was created under the presidency of General Jacques Massu, a Gaullist sympathiser. General Raoul Salan, Commander-in-Chief in Algeria, announced on radio that he was assuming provisional power, and appealed for confidence in himself.

At a 19 May press conference, de Gaulle asserted again that he was at the disposal of the country. As a journalist expressed the concerns of some who feared that he would violate civil liberties, de Gaulle retorted vehemently: "Have I ever done that? On the contrary, I have re-established them when they had disappeared. Who honestly believes that, at age 67, I would start a career as a dictator?" A constitutionalist by conviction, he maintained throughout the crisis that he would accept power only from the lawfully constituted authorities. De Gaulle did not wish to repeat the difficulty the Free French movement experienced in establishing legitimacy as the rightful government. He told an aide that the rebel generals "will not find de Gaulle in their baggage".

The crisis deepened as French paratroops from Algeria seized Corsica and a landing near Paris was discussed (Operation Resurrection).

Political leaders on many sides agreed to support the General's return to power, except François Mitterrand, Pierre Mendès France, Alain Savary, the Communist Party, and certain other leftists.

On 29 May the French President, René Coty, told parliament that the nation was on the brink of civil war, so he was "turning towards the most illustrious of Frenchmen, towards the man who, in the darkest years of our history, was our chief for the reconquest of freedom and who refused dictatorship in order to re-establish the Republic. I ask General de Gaulle to confer with the head of state and to examine with him what, in the framework of Republican legality, is necessary for the immediate formation of a government of national safety and what can be done, in a fairly short time, for a deep reform of our institutions." De Gaulle accepted Coty's proposal under the precondition that a new constitution would be introduced creating a powerful presidency in which a sole executive, the first of which was to be himself, ruled for seven-year periods. Another condition was that he be granted extraordinary powers for a period of six months.

De Gaulle remained intent on replacing the weak constitution of the Fourth Republic. He is sometimes described as the author of the new constitution, as he commissioned it and was responsible for its overall framework. The actual drafter of the text was Michel Debré who wrote up de Gaulle's political ideas and guided the text through the enactment process. On 1 June 1958, de Gaulle became Prime Minister and was given emergency powers for six months by the National Assembly, fulfilling his desire for parliamentary legitimacy.

De Gaulle's cabinet received strong support from right parties, split support from left of center parties, and strong opposition from the Communist Party. In the vote on 1 June 1958, 329 votes were cast in favor and 224 against, out of 593 deputies. The composition of the vote was as follows:

Votes in favor: 42 out of 95 Socialists led by Guy Mollet, 24 out of 42 Radicals led by Felix Gaillard, 10 out of 20 UDSR deputies led by Rene Pleven, all 14 RGR deputies led by Edgar Faure, 70 out of 74 MRP deputies led by Georges Bidault, around 22 Social Republicans led by Jacques Chelmas-Delban, around 95 Independent-Peasants led by Antoine Pinay, and around 52 Poujadists.

Votes against: 141 Communists, 49 Socialists led by Gaston Deferre, 18 Radicals led by Pierre Mendes-France, and 4 UDSR deputies led by François Mitterrand.

On 28 September 1958, a referendum took place and 82.6 percent of those who voted supported the new constitution and the creation of the Fifth Republic. The colonies (Algeria was officially a part of France, not a colony) were given the choice between immediate independence and the new constitution. All African colonies voted for the new constitution and the replacement of the French Union by the French Community, except Guinea, which thus became the first French African colony to gain independence and immediately lost all French assistance.

1958–1962: Founding of the Fifth Republic 

In the November 1958 election, Charles de Gaulle and his supporters (initially organised in the Union pour la Nouvelle République-Union Démocratique du Travail, then the Union des Démocrates pour la Vème République, later still the Union des Démocrates pour la République, UDR) won a comfortable majority. On  21 December, he was elected President of France by the electoral college with 78% of the vote; he was inaugurated in January 1959. As head of state, he also became ex officio the Co-Prince of Andorra.

De Gaulle oversaw tough economic measures to revitalise the country, including the issuing of a new franc (worth 100 old francs). Less than a year after taking office, he was confronted with national tragedy, after the Malpasset Dam in Var collapsed in early December, killing over 400 in floods. Internationally, he rebuffed both the United States and the Soviet Union, pushing for an independent France with its own nuclear weapons and strongly encouraged a "Free Europe", believing that a confederation of all European nations would restore the past glories of the great European empires.

He set about building Franco-German cooperation as the cornerstone of the European Economic Community (EEC), paying the first state visit to Germany by a French head of state since Napoleon. In January 1963, Germany and France signed a treaty of friendship, the Élysée Treaty. France also reduced its dollar reserves, trading them for gold from the Federal government of the United States, thereby reducing American economic influence abroad.

On 23 November 1959, in a speech in Strasbourg, he announced his vision for Europe:

His expression, "Europe, from the Atlantic to the Urals", has often been cited throughout the history of European integration. It became, for the next ten years, a favourite political rallying cry of de Gaulle's. His vision stood in contrast to the Atlanticism of the United States and Britain, preferring instead a Europe that would act as a third pole between the United States and the Soviet Union. By including in his ideal of Europe all the territory up to the Urals, de Gaulle was implicitly offering détente to the Soviets.
As the last chief of government of the Fourth Republic, de Gaulle made sure that the Treaty of Rome creating the European Economic Community was fully implemented, and that the British project of Free Trade Area was rejected, to the extent that he was sometimes considered as a "Father of Europe".

Algeria 

Upon becoming president, de Gaulle was faced with the urgent task of finding a way to bring to an end the bloody and divisive war in Algeria. His intentions were obscure. He had immediately visited Algeria and declared, Je vous ai compris—'I have understood you', and each competing interest had wished to believe it was them that he had understood. The settlers assumed he supported them, and would be stunned when he did not. In Paris, the left wanted independence for Algeria. Although the military's near-coup had contributed to his return to power, de Gaulle soon ordered all officers to quit the rebellious Committees of Public Safety. Such actions greatly angered the pieds-noirs and their military supporters.

He faced uprisings in Algeria by the pied-noirs and the French armed forces. On assuming the prime minister role in June 1958 he immediately went to Algeria, and neutralised the army there, with its 600,000 soldiers. The Algiers Committee of Public Safety was loud in its demands on behalf of the settlers, but de Gaulle made more visits and sidestepped them. For the long term he devised a plan to modernize Algeria's traditional economy, deescalated the war, and offered Algeria self-determination in 1959. A pied-noir revolt in 1960 failed, and another attempted coup failed in April 1961. French voters approved his course in a 1961 referendum on Algerian self-determination. De Gaulle arranged a cease-fire in Algeria with the March 1962 Evian Accords, legitimated by another referendum a month later. It gave victory to the FLN, which came to power and declared independence. The long crisis was over.

Although the Algerian issue was settled, Prime Minister Michel Debré resigned over the final settlement and was replaced with Georges Pompidou on 14 April 1962. France recognised Algerian independence on 3 July 1962, and a blanket amnesty law was belatedly voted in 1968, covering all crimes committed by the French army during the war. In just a few months in 1962, 900,000 Pied-Noirs left the country. After 5 July, the exodus accelerated in the wake of the French deaths during the Oran massacre of 1962.

Assassination attempts 

De Gaulle was targeted for death by the Organisation armée secrète (OAS), in retaliation for his Algerian initiatives. Several assassination attempts were made on him; the most famous occurred on 22 August 1962, when he and his wife narrowly escaped from an organized machine gun ambush on their Citroën DS limousine. De Gaulle commented "Ils tirent comme des cochons" ("They shoot like pigs"). The attack was arranged by Colonel Jean-Marie Bastien-Thiry at Petit-Clamart.Bastien-Thiry was later executed by firing squad on March 11 1963, the last execution done by this method in France. The other perpetrators had their sentence commuted from death to life imprisonment. Frederick Forsyth used this incident as a basis for his novel The Day of the Jackal.

It is claimed that there were at least 30 assassination attempts against de Gaulle throughout his lifetime.

Direct presidential elections 

In September 1962, de Gaulle sought a constitutional amendment to allow the president to be directly elected by the people and issued another referendum to this end. After a motion of censure voted by the parliament on 4 October 1962, de Gaulle dissolved the National Assembly and held new elections. Although the left progressed, the Gaullists won an increased majority—this despite opposition from the Christian democratic Popular Republican Movement (MRP) and the National Centre of Independents and Peasants (CNIP) who criticised de Gaulle's euroscepticism and presidentialism.

De Gaulle's proposal to change the election procedure for the French presidency was approved at the referendum on 28 October 1962 by more than three-fifths of voters despite a broad "coalition of no" formed by most of the parties, opposed to a presidential regime. Thereafter the president was to be elected by direct universal suffrage for the first time since Louis Napoleon in 1848.

1962–1968: Politics of grandeur 
With the Algerian conflict behind him, de Gaulle was able to achieve his two main objectives, the reform and development of the French economy, and the promotion of an independent foreign policy and a strong presence on the international stage. This was named by foreign observers the "politics of grandeur" (politique de grandeur). See Gaullism.

"Thirty glorious years" 
In the immediate post-war years France was in poor shape; wages remained at around half prewar levels, the winter of 1946–1947 did extensive damage to crops, leading to a reduction in the bread ration, hunger and disease remained rife and the black market continued to flourish. Germany was in an even worse position, but after 1948 things began to improve dramatically with the introduction of Marshall Aid—large scale American financial assistance given to help rebuild European economies and infrastructure. This laid the foundations of a meticulously planned program of investments in energy, transport and heavy industry, overseen by the government of Prime Minister Georges Pompidou.

In the context of a population boom unseen in France since the 18th century, the government intervened heavily in the economy, using dirigisme—a unique combination of free-market and state-directed economy—with indicative five-year plans as its main tool. This was followed by a rapid transformation and expansion of the French economy.

High-profile projects, mostly but not always financially successful, were launched: the extension of Marseille's harbour (soon ranking third in Europe and first in the Mediterranean); the promotion of the Caravelle passenger jetliner (a predecessor of Airbus); the decision to start building the supersonic Franco-British Concorde airliner in Toulouse; the expansion of the French auto industry with state-owned Renault at its centre; and the building of the first motorways between Paris and the provinces.

Aided by these projects, the French economy recorded growth rates unrivalled since the 19th century. In 1964, for the first time in nearly 100 years France's GDP overtook that of the United Kingdom for a time. This period is still remembered in France with some nostalgia as the peak of the Trente Glorieuses ("Thirty Glorious Years" of economic growth between 1945 and 1974).

In 1967, de Gaulle decreed a law that obliged all firms over certain sizes to distribute a small portion of their profits to their employees. By 1974, as a result of this measure, French employees received an average of 700 francs per head, equivalent to 3.2% of their salary.

Fourth nuclear power 

During his first tenure as president, de Gaulle became enthusiastic about the possibilities of nuclear power. France had carried out important work in the early development of atomic energy and in October 1945, he established the French Atomic Energy Commission Commissariat à l'énergie atomique, (CEA) responsible for all scientific, commercial, and military uses of nuclear energy. However, partly due to communist influences in government opposed to proliferation, research stalled and France was excluded from American, British and Canadian nuclear efforts.

By October 1952, the United Kingdom had become the third country—after the United States and the Soviet Union—to independently test and develop nuclear weapons. This gave Britain the capability to launch a nuclear strike via its Vulcan bomber force and they began developing a ballistic missile program known as Blue Streak.

As early as April 1954 while out of power, de Gaulle argued that France must have its own nuclear arsenal as nuclear weapons were seen as a national status symbol and a way of maintaining international prestige with a place at the 'top table' of the United Nations. Full-scale research began again in late 1954 when Prime Minister Pierre Mendès France authorized a plan to develop the atomic bomb; large deposits of uranium had been discovered near Limoges in central France, providing the researchers with an unrestricted supply of nuclear fuel. France's independent Force de Frappe (strike force) came into being soon after de Gaulle's election with his authorization for the first nuclear test.

With the cancellation of Blue Streak, the US agreed to supply Britain with its Skybolt and later Polaris weapons systems, and in 1958, the two nations signed the Mutual Defence Agreement forging close links which have seen the US and UK cooperate on nuclear security matters ever since. Although at the time it was still a full member of NATO, France proceeded to develop its own independent nuclear technologies—this would enable it to become a partner in any reprisals and would give it a voice in matters of atomic control.

After six years of effort, on 13 February 1960, France became the world's fourth nuclear power when a high-powered nuclear device was exploded in the Sahara some 700 miles south-south-west of Algiers. In August 1963, France decided against signing the Partial Test Ban Treaty designed to slow the arms race because it would have prohibited it from testing nuclear weapons above ground. France continued to carry out tests at the Algerian site until 1966, under an agreement with the newly independent Algeria. France's testing program then moved to the Mururoa and Fangataufa Atolls in the South Pacific.

In November 1967, an article by the French Chief of the General Staff (but inspired by de Gaulle) in the Revue de la Défense Nationale caused international consternation. It was stated that the French nuclear force should be capable of firing "in all directions"—thus including even America as a potential target. This surprising statement was intended as a declaration of French national independence, and was in retaliation to a warning issued long ago by Dean Rusk that US missiles would be aimed at France if it attempted to employ atomic weapons outside an agreed plan. However, criticism of de Gaulle was growing over his tendency to act alone with little regard for the views of others. In August, concern over de Gaulle's policies had been voiced by Valéry Giscard d'Estaing when he queried 'the solitary exercise of power'.

NATO 

With the onset of the Cold War and the perceived threat of invasion from the Soviet Union and the countries of the eastern bloc, the United States, Canada and a number of western European countries set up the North Atlantic Treaty Organization (NATO) to co-ordinate a military response to any possible attack. France played a key role during the early days of the organisation, providing a large military contingent and agreeing—after much soul-searching—to the participation of West German forces. But after his election in 1958 Charles de Gaulle took the view that the organisation was too dominated by the US and UK, and that America would not fulfill its promise to defend Europe in the event of a Soviet invasion.

De Gaulle demanded political parity with Britain and America in NATO, and for its geographic coverage to be extended to include French territories abroad, including Algeria, then experiencing civil war. This was not forthcoming, and so in March 1959 France, citing the need for it to maintain its own independent military strategy, withdrew its Mediterranean Fleet (ALESCMED) from NATO, and a few months later de Gaulle demanded the removal of all US nuclear weapons from French territory.

De Gaulle hosted a superpower summit on 17 May 1960 for arms limitation talks and détente efforts in the wake of the 1960 U-2 incident between United States President Dwight Eisenhower, Soviet Premier Nikita Khrushchev, and United Kingdom Prime Minister Harold Macmillan. De Gaulle's warm relations with Eisenhower were noticed by United States military observers at that time. De Gaulle told Eisenhower: "Obviously you cannot apologize but you must decide how you wish to handle this. I will do everything I can to be helpful without being openly partisan." When Khrushchev condemned the United States U-2 flights, de Gaulle expressed to Khrushchev his disapproval of 18 near-simultaneous secret Soviet satellite overflights of French territory; Khrushchev denied knowledge of the satellite overflights. Lieutenant General Vernon A. Walters wrote that after Khrushchev left, "De Gaulle came over to Eisenhower and took him by the arm. He took me also by the elbow and, taking us a little apart, he said to Eisenhower, 'I do not know what Khrushchev is going to do, nor what is going to happen, but whatever he does, I want you to know that I am with you to the end.' I was astounded at this statement, and Eisenhower was clearly moved by his unexpected expression of unconditional support". General Walters was struck by de Gaulle's "unconditional support" of the United States during that "crucial time". De Gaulle then tried to revive the talks by inviting all the delegates to another conference at the Élysée Palace to discuss the situation, but the summit ultimately dissolved in the wake of the U-2 incident.

In 1964, de Gaulle visited the Soviet Union, where he hoped to establish France as an alternative influence in the Cold War. De Gaulle always viewed Communism as a passing phenomenon, and never used the term 'Soviet Union', always calling it Russia. In his view, Russian national interests rather than Communist ideology determined the decision-making in the Kremlin. Later, he proclaimed a new alliance between the nations, but although Soviet premier Alexei Kosygin later visited Paris, the Soviets clearly did not consider France a superpower and knew that they would remain dependent on the NATO alliance in the event of a war. In 1965, de Gaulle pulled France out of SEATO, the southeast Asian equivalent of NATO, and refused to participate in any future NATO maneuvers.

In February 1966, France withdrew from the NATO Military Command Structure, but remained within the organisation. De Gaulle, haunted by the memories of 1940, wanted France to remain the master of the decisions affecting it, unlike in the 1930s when it had to follow in step with its British ally. He also ordered all foreign military personnel to leave France within a year. This latter action was particularly badly received in the US, prompting Dean Rusk, the US Secretary of State, to ask de Gaulle whether the removal of American military personnel was to include exhumation of the 50,000 American war dead buried in French cemeteries.

European Economic Community (EEC) 
France, experiencing the disintegration of its colonial empire and severe problems in Algeria, turned towards Europe after the Suez Crisis, and to West Germany in particular. In the years after, the economies of both nations integrated and they led the drive towards European unity.

One of the conditions of Marshall Aid was that the nations' leaders must co-ordinate economic efforts and pool the supply of raw materials. By far the most critical commodities in driving growth were coal and steel. France assumed it would receive large amounts of high-quality German coal from the Ruhr as reparations for the war, but the US refused to allow this, fearing a repetition of the bitterness after the Treaty of Versailles which partly caused World War II.

Under the inspiration of the French statesmen Jean Monnet and Robert Schuman, together with the German leader Konrad Adenauer, the rift between the two nations had begun to heal and in 1951, along with Italy and the Benelux countries, they formed the European Coal and Steel Community. Following the Treaty of Rome of 1957, this became the European Economic Community.

De Gaulle had not been instrumental in setting up the new organization and, from the start, he opposed efforts by fellow EEC member countries to move toward some form of political integration that, in de Gaulle's thinking, would impinge on the sovereignty of France, both internally and externally. To counter those supranational tendencies that he disparaged, he put forward in 1961 the so-called Fouchet Plan that maintained all decision-making powers in the hands of governments, reducing the projected European parliamentary assembly to a mere consultative assembly. As expected, the plan was rejected by France's partners. In July 1965, de Gaulle provoked a major six-month crisis when he ordered the boycott of EEC institutions (see Empty chair crisis below) until his demands – the withdrawal of a European Commission proposal to reinforce the community institutions to the detriment of national sovereignty, and the acceptance of France's proposal regarding the financing of the newly established Common Agricultural Policy (CAP) – were met with the Luxembourg compromise.

De Gaulle, who in spite of recent history admired Germany and spoke excellent German, as well as English, established a good relationship with the aging West German Chancellor Konrad Adenauer—culminating in the Elysee Treaty in 1963—and in the first few years of the Common Market, France's industrial exports to the other five members tripled and its farm export almost quadrupled. The franc became a solid, stable currency for the first time in half a century, and the economy mostly boomed. Adenauer however, all too aware of the importance of American support in Europe, gently distanced himself from the general's more extreme ideas, wanting no suggestion that any new European community would in any sense challenge or set itself at odds with the US. In Adenauer's eyes, the support of the US was more important than any question of European prestige. Adenauer was also anxious to reassure Britain that nothing was being done behind its back and was quick to inform British Prime Minister Harold Macmillan of any new developments.

Great Britain initially declined to join the EEC, preferring to remain with another organisation known as the European Free Trade Area, mostly consisting of the northern European countries and Portugal. By the late 1950s, German and French living standards began to exceed those in Britain, and the government of Harold Macmillan, realising that the EEC was a stronger trade bloc than EFTA, began negotiations to join.

De Gaulle vetoed the British application to join the European Economic Community (EEC) in 1963, famously uttering the single word 'non' into the television cameras at the critical moment, a statement used to sum up French opposition towards Britain for many years afterwards. Macmillan said afterwards that he always believed that de Gaulle would prevent Britain joining, but thought he would do it quietly, behind the scenes. He later complained privately that "all our plans are in tatters".

American President John F. Kennedy urged de Gaulle to accept the United Kingdom in the EEC, stating that a Europe without Great Britain would create a situation in which the United States were bearing the enormous costs of Europe's protection without any voice. Kennedy applied pressure to de Gaulle by threatening to withdraw American troops from European soil, but de Gaulle believed that the United States would lose the Cold War if they were to leave Europe. It encouraged de Gaulle to see Great Britain as America's "Trojan Horse".

British Prime Minister Churchill once said to him that if he had the choice between France and the United States, he would always choose the United States. Churchill's successor, Macmillan, prioritised the rebuilding of the Anglo-American "Special Relationship". With the American agreement to supply Britain with the Skybolt nuclear missile, de Gaulle thought that the United Kingdom would not go along with his vision for a West European strategically independent from the United States. He maintained there were incompatibilities between continental European and British economic interests. In addition, he demanded that the United Kingdom accept all the conditions laid down by the six existing members of the EEC (Belgium, France, West Germany, Italy, Luxembourg, Netherlands) and revoke its commitments to countries within its own free trade area (which France had not done with its own). He supported a deepening and an acceleration of Common Market integration rather than an expansion.

However, in this latter respect, a detailed study of the formative years of the EEC argues that the defence of French economic interests, especially in agriculture, in fact played a more dominant role in determining de Gaulle's stance towards British entry than the various political and foreign policy considerations that have often been cited.

Dean Acheson believed that Britain made a grave error in not signing up to European integration right from the start, and that they continued to suffer the political consequences for at least two decades afterwards. However he also stated his belief that de Gaulle used the 'Common Market' (as it was then termed) as an "exclusionary device to direct European trade towards the interest of France and against that of the United States, Britain and other countries."

Claiming continental European solidarity, de Gaulle again rejected British entry when they next applied to join the community in December 1967 under the Labour leadership of Harold Wilson. During negotiations, de Gaulle chided Britain for relying too much on the Americans, saying that sooner or later they would always do what was in their best interests. Wilson said he then gently raised the spectre of the threat of a newly powerful Germany as a result of the EEC, which de Gaulle agreed was a risk. After de Gaulle left office the United Kingdom applied again and finally became a member of the EEC in January 1973.

Recognition of the People's Republic of China 

In January 1964, France was, after the UK, among the first of the major Western powers to open diplomatic relations with the People's Republic of China (PRC), which was established in 1949 and which was isolated on the international scene. By recognizing Mao Zedong's government, de Gaulle signaled to both Washington and Moscow that France intended to deploy an independent foreign policy. The move was criticized in the United States as it seemed to seriously damage US policy of containment in Asia. De Gaulle justified this action by "the weight of evidence and reason", considering that China's demographic weight and geographic extent put it in a position to have a global leading role. De Gaulle also used this opportunity to arouse rivalry between the USSR and China, a policy that was followed several years later by Henry Kissinger's "triangular diplomacy" which also aimed to create a Sino-Soviet split.

France established diplomatic relations with the People's Republic of China – the first step towards formal recognition without first severing links with the Republic of China (Taiwan), led by Chiang Kai-shek. Hitherto the PRC had insisted that all nations abide by a "one China" condition, and at first it was unclear how the matter would be settled. However, the agreement to exchange ambassadors was subject to a delay of three months, and in February, Chiang Kai-shek resolved the problem by cutting off diplomatic relations with France. Eight years later, US President Richard Nixon visited the PRC and began normalising relations—a policy which was confirmed in the Shanghai Communiqué of 28 February 1972.

As part of a European tour, Nixon visited France in 1969. He and de Gaulle both shared the same non-Wilsonian approach to world affairs, believing in nations and their relative strengths, rather than in ideologies, international organisations, or multilateral agreements. De Gaulle is famously known for calling the UN the pejorative "" ("the thingamajig").

Visit to Latin America 

During the autumn of 1964, de Gaulle embarked on a grueling 20,000-mile trek across Latin America despite being a month away from his 75th birthday, a recent operation for prostate cancer, and concerns over security. He had visited Mexico the previous year and spoke, in Spanish, to the Mexican people on the eve of their celebrations of their independence at the Palacio Nacional in Mexico City. During his new 26-day visit, he was again keen to gain both cultural and economic influence. He spoke constantly of his resentment of US influence in Latin America—"that some states should establish a power of political or economic direction outside their own borders". Yet France could provide no investment or aid to match that from Washington.

US dollar crisis 
In the Bretton Woods system put in place in 1944, US dollars were convertible to gold. In France, it was called "America's exorbitant privilege" as it resulted in an "asymmetric financial system" where foreigners "see themselves supporting American living standards and subsidizing American multinationals". As American economist Barry Eichengreen summarized: "It costs only a few cents for the Bureau of Engraving and Printing to produce a $100 bill, but other countries had to pony up $100 of actual goods in order to obtain one". In February 1965, President Charles de Gaulle announced his intention to exchange its US dollar reserves for gold at the official exchange rate. He sent the French Navy across the Atlantic to pick up the French reserve of gold, which had been moved there during World War II, and was followed by several countries. As it resulted in considerably reducing US gold stock and US economic influence, it led US President Richard Nixon to unilaterally end the convertibility of the dollar to gold on 15 August 1971 (the "Nixon Shock"). This was meant to be a temporary measure but the dollar became permanently a floating fiat money and in October 1976, the US government officially changed the definition of the dollar as references to gold were removed from statutes.

Second term 
In December 1965, de Gaulle returned as president for a second seven-year term. In the first round he did not win the expected majority, receiving 45% of the vote. Both of his main rivals did better than expected; the leftist François Mitterrand received 32% and Jean Lecanuet, who advocated for what Life described as "Gaullism without de Gaulle", received 16%. De Gaulle won a majority in the second round, with Mitterrand receiving 44.8%.

In September 1966, in a famous speech in Phnom Penh in Cambodia, he expressed France's disapproval of the US involvement in the Vietnam War, calling for a US withdrawal from Vietnam as the only way to ensure peace. De Gaulle considered the war to be the "greatest absurdity of the twentieth century". De Gaulle conversed frequently with George Ball, United States President Lyndon Johnson's Under Secretary of State, and told Ball that he feared that the United States risked repeating France's tragic experience in Vietnam, which de Gaulle called "ce pays pourri" ("the rotten country"). Ball later sent a 76-page memorandum to Johnson critiquing Johnson's current Vietnam policy in October 1964.

De Gaulle later visited Guadeloupe for two days, in the aftermath of Hurricane Inez, bringing aid which totaled billions of francs.

Empty Chair Crisis 

During the establishment of the European Community, de Gaulle helped precipitate the Empty Chair Crisis, one of the greatest crises in the history of the EEC. It involved the financing of the Common Agricultural Policy, but almost more importantly the use of qualified majority voting in the EC (as opposed to unanimity). In June 1965, after France and the other five members could not agree, de Gaulle withdrew France's representatives from the EC. Their absence left the organisation essentially unable to run its affairs until the Luxembourg compromise was reached in January 1966. De Gaulle succeeded in influencing the decision-making mechanism written into the Treaty of Rome by insisting on solidarity founded on mutual understanding. He vetoed Britain's entry into the EEC a second time, in June 1967.

Six-Day War 
With tension rising in the Middle East in 1967, de Gaulle on 2 June declared an arms embargo against Israel, just three days before the outbreak of the Six-Day War. This, however, did not affect spare parts for the French military hardware with which the Israeli armed forces were equipped.

This was an abrupt change in French policy. In 1956, France, Britain and Israel had cooperated in an elaborate effort to retake the Suez Canal from Egypt. Israel's air force operated French Mirage and Mystère jets in the Six-Day War, and its navy was building its new missile boats in Cherbourg. Though paid for, their transfer to Israel was now blocked by de Gaulle's government. But they were smuggled out in an operation that drew further denunciations from the French government. The last boats took to the sea in December 1969, directly after a major deal between France and now-independent Algeria exchanging French armaments for Algerian oil.

Under de Gaulle, following the independence of Algeria, France embarked on foreign policy more favorable to the Arab side. President de Gaulle's position in 1967 at the time of the Six-Day War played a part in France's new-found popularity in the Arab world. Israel turned towards the United States for arms, and toward its own industry. In a televised news conference on 27 November 1967, de Gaulle described the Jewish people as "this elite people, sure of themselves and domineering".

In his letter to David Ben-Gurion dated 9 January 1968, he explained that he was convinced that Israel had ignored his warnings and overstepped the bounds of moderation by taking possession of Jerusalem, and Jordanian, Egyptian, and Syrian territory by force of arms. He felt Israel had exercised repression and expulsions during the occupation and that it amounted to annexation. He said that provided Israel withdrew its forces, it appeared that it might be possible to reach a solution through the UN framework which could include assurances of a dignified and fair future for refugees and minorities in the Middle East, recognition from Israel's neighbours, and freedom of navigation through the Gulf of Aqaba and the Suez Canal.

Nigerian Civil War 
The Eastern Region of Nigeria declared itself independent under the name of the Independent Republic of Biafra on 30 May 1967. On 6 July, the first shots in the Nigerian Civil War were fired, marking the start of a conflict that lasted until January 1970. Britain provided military aid to the Federal Republic of Nigeria—yet more was made available by the Soviet Union. Under de Gaulle's leadership, France embarked on a period of interference outside the traditional French zone of influence. A policy geared toward the break-up of Nigeria put Britain and France into opposing camps. Relations between France and Nigeria had been under strain since the third French nuclear explosion in the Sahara in December 1960. From August 1968, when its embargo was lifted, France provided limited and covert support to the Biafra rebels. Although French arms helped to keep Biafra in action for the final 15 months of the civil war, its involvement was seen as insufficient and counterproductive. The Biafran chief of staff stated that the French "did more harm than good by raising false hopes and by providing the British with an excuse to reinforce Nigeria."

Vive le Québec libre! 

In July 1967, de Gaulle visited Canada, which was celebrating its centenary with a world fair in Montreal, Expo 67. On 24 July, speaking to a large crowd from a balcony at Montreal's city hall, de Gaulle shouted "Vive le Québec libre! Vive le Canada français! Et vive la France!" (Long live free Quebec! Long live French Canada, and long live France!). The Canadian media harshly criticized the statement, and the Prime Minister of Canada, Lester B. Pearson, stated that "Canadians do not need to be liberated". De Gaulle left Canada abruptly two days later, without proceeding to Ottawa as scheduled. He never returned to Canada. The speech offended many English-speaking Canadians and was heavily criticized in France as well, and led to a significant diplomatic rift between the two countries.

The event however was seen as a watershed moment by the Quebec sovereignty movement, and is still a significant milestone of Quebec's history to the eyes of most Quebecers.

In the following year, de Gaulle visited Brittany, where he declaimed a poem written by his uncle (also called Charles de Gaulle) in the Breton language. The speech followed a series of crackdowns on Breton nationalism. De Gaulle was accused of hypocrisy, on the one hand supporting a "free" Quebec because of linguistic and ethnic differences from other Canadians, while on the other hand suppressing a regional and ethnic nationalist movement in Brittany.

Official visit to Poland 
General de Gaulle paid an official visit to Poland on 6 September 1967 and spent an entire week there. De Gaulle described it as his "pilgrimage to Poland" and visited Warsaw, Gdańsk, Kraków and Nazi death camp Auschwitz-Birkenau. He met with crowds of people on the streets and shouted (in Polish) "Long live Poland! Our dear, noble and brave Poland!". Without discussion, de Gaulle announced that France officially recognized the new Polish western border that was established in 1945.

May 1968 

De Gaulle's government was criticized within France, particularly for its heavy-handed style. While the written press and elections were free, and private stations such as Europe 1 were able to broadcast in French from abroad, the state's ORTF had a monopoly on television and radio. This monopoly meant that the government was in a position to directly influence broadcast news. In many respects, Gaullist France was conservative, Catholic, and there were few women in high-level political posts (in May 1968, the government's ministers were 100% male). Many factors contributed to a general weariness of sections of the public, particularly the student youth, which led to the events of May 1968.

The mass demonstrations and strikes in France in May 1968 severely challenged De Gaulle's legitimacy. He and other government leaders feared that the country was on the brink of revolution or civil war. On 29 May, De Gaulle disappeared without notifying Prime Minister Pompidou or anyone else in the government, stunning the country. He fled to Baden-Baden in Germany to meet with General Massu, head of the French military there, to discuss possible army intervention against the protesters. De Gaulle returned to France after being assured of the military's support, in return for which De Gaulle agreed to amnesty for the 1961 coup plotters and OAS members.

In a private meeting discussing the students' and workers' demands for direct participation in business and government he coined the phrase "La réforme oui, la chienlit non", which can be politely translated as 'reform yes, masquerade/chaos no.' It was a vernacular scatological pun meaning 'chie-en-lit, no' (shit-in-bed, no). The term is now common parlance in French political commentary, used both critically and ironically referring back to de Gaulle.

But de Gaulle offered to accept some of the reforms the demonstrators sought. He again considered a referendum to support his moves, but on 30 May, Pompidou persuaded him to dissolve parliament (in which the government had all but lost its majority in the March 1967 elections) and hold new elections instead. The June 1968 elections were a major success for the Gaullists and their allies; when shown the spectre of revolution or civil war, the majority of the country rallied to him. His party won 352 of 487 seats, but de Gaulle remained personally unpopular; a survey conducted immediately after the crisis showed that a majority of the country saw him as too old, too self-centered, too authoritarian, too conservative, and too anti-American.

Later life

Retirement 

De Gaulle resigned the presidency at noon, 28 April 1969, following the rejection of his proposed reform of the Senate and local governments in a nationwide referendum. In an eight-minute televised speech two days before the referendum, De Gaulle warned that if he was "disavowed" by a majority of the voters, he would resign his office immediately. This ultimatum, coupled with increased De Gaulle fatigue among the French, convinced many that this was an opportunity to be rid of the 78-year-old general and the reform package was rejected. Two months later Georges Pompidou was elected as his successor.

De Gaulle retired once again to his beloved nine-acre country estate, La Boisserie (the woodland glade), in Colombey-les-Deux-Églises, 120 miles southeast of Paris. There the General, who often described old age as a "shipwreck", continued his memoirs, dictated to his secretary from notes. To visitors, de Gaulle said, "I will finish three books, if God grants me life." The Renewal, the first of three planned volumes to be called Memoirs of Hope, was quickly finished and immediately became the fastest seller in French publishing history.

Death 
On 9 November 1970, less than two weeks before his 80th birthday, Charles de Gaulle died suddenly, despite enjoying very robust health his entire life (except for a prostate operation a few years earlier). He had been watching the evening news on television and playing Solitaire around 7:40 p.m. when he suddenly pointed to his head and said, "I feel a pain right here", and then collapsed. His wife called the doctor and the local priest, but by the time they arrived he had died from an aneurysm. His wife asked that she be allowed to inform her family before the news was released. She was able to contact her daughter in Paris quickly, but their son, who was in the navy, was difficult to track down. President Georges Pompidou was not informed until 4 AM the next day, and announced the general's death on television some 18 hours after the event. He simply said, "Le général de Gaulle est mort; la France est veuve." ("General de Gaulle is dead. France is a widow.")

De Gaulle had made arrangements that insisted his funeral be held at Colombey, and that no presidents or ministers attend his funeral—only his Compagnons de la Libération. Despite his wishes, such were the number of foreign dignitaries who wanted to honor de Gaulle that Pompidou was forced to arrange a separate memorial service at the Notre-Dame Cathedral, to be held at the same time as his actual funeral.

The funeral on 12 November 1970 was the biggest such event in French history, with hundreds of thousands of French people — many carrying blankets and picnic baskets — and thousands of cars parked in the roads and fields along the routes to the two venues. On the day of the funeral, there was national mourning, many entertainment and cultural events were canceled, and schools and offices were closed. Thousands of guests attended the event, included De Gaulle's successor Georges Pompidou, U.S. president Richard Nixon, British prime minister Edward Heath, UN secretary-general U Thant, Soviet statesman Nikolai Podgorny, Italian president Giuseppe Saragat, West German chancellor Willy Brandt and Queen Juliana of the Netherlands. Special trains were laid on to bring extra mourners to the region and the crowd was packed so tightly that those who fainted had to be passed overhead toward first-aid stations at the rear. The General was conveyed to the church on an armoured reconnaissance vehicle and carried to his grave, next to his daughter Anne, by eight young men of Colombey. As he was lowered into the ground, the bells of all the churches in France tolled, starting from Notre Dame and spreading out from there.

De Gaulle specified that his tombstone bear the simple inscription of his name and his years of birth and death. Therefore, it simply states, "Charles de Gaulle, 1890–1970". At the service, President Pompidou said, "de Gaulle gave France her governing institutions, her independence and her place in the world." André Malraux, the writer and intellectual who served as his Minister of Culture, called him "a man of the day before yesterday and the day after tomorrow." De Gaulle's family turned the La Boisserie residence into a foundation. It currently houses the Charles de Gaulle Museum.

Personal life

De Gaulle married Yvonne Vendroux on 7 April 1921 in Église Notre-Dame de Calais. They had three children: Philippe (born 1921), Élisabeth (1924–2013), who married General Alain de Boissieu, and Anne (1928–1948). Anne had Down syndrome and died of pneumonia at the age of 20. He always had a particular love for Anne; one Colombey resident recalled how he used to walk with her hand-in-hand around the property, caressing her and talking quietly about the things she understood.

De Gaulle had an older brother Xavier (1887–1955) and sister Marie-Agnes (1889–1983), and two younger brothers, Jacques (1893–1946) and Pierre (1897–1959). He was particularly close to the youngest, Pierre, who so resembled him that presidential bodyguards often saluted him by mistake when he visited his famous brother or accompanied him on official visits.

One of De Gaulle's grandsons, also named Charles de Gaulle, was a member of the European Parliament from 1994 to 2004, his last tenure being for the National Front. The younger Charles de Gaulle's move to the anti-Gaullist Front National was widely condemned by other family members, in open letters and newspaper interviews. "It was like hearing the pope had converted to Islam", one said. Another grandson, Jean de Gaulle, was a member of the French parliament until his retirement in 2007.

Legacy

Reputation 

De Gaulle made 31 regional tours during his presidency, visiting every French department; for many small towns, the visit was an important moment in history. He enjoyed entering the welcoming crowds; an aide noted how often people said "he saw me" or "he touched me", and another recalled how a mother begged de Gaulle for the king's touch on her baby. They, supporters, and opponents surmised that de Gaulle was a monarch-like figure for the French.

Historians have accorded Napoleon and de Gaulle the top-ranking status of French leaders in the 19th and 20th centuries. According to a 2005 survey, carried out in the context of the tenth anniversary of the death of Socialist President François Mitterrand, 35 percent of respondents said Mitterrand was the best French president ever, followed by Charles de Gaulle (30 percent) and then Jacques Chirac (12 percent). Another poll by BVA four years later showed that 87% of French people regarded his presidency positively.

Statues honouring de Gaulle have been erected in London, Warsaw, in Moscow, Bucharest and Quebec. The first Algerian president, Ahmed Ben Bella, said that de Gaulle was the "military leader who brought us the hardest blows" prior to Algerian independence, but "saw further" than other politicians, and had a "universal dimension that is too often lacking in current leaders." Likewise, Léopold Sédar Senghor, the first president of Senegal, said that few Western leaders could boast of having risked their lives to grant a colony independence.

In 1990, President Mitterrand, de Gaulle's old political rival, presided over the celebrations to mark the 100th anniversary of his birth. Mitterrand, who once wrote a vitriolic critique of him called the "Permanent Coup d'État", quoted a recent opinion poll, saying, "As General de Gaulle, he has entered the pantheon of great national heroes, where he ranks ahead of Napoleon and behind only Charlemagne." Under the influence of Jean-Pierre Chevènement, the leader of CERES, the left-wing and souverainist faction of the Socialist Party, Mitterrand had, except on certain economic and social policies, rallied to much of Gaullism. Between the mid-1970s and mid-1990s there developed a left-right consensus, dubbed "Gaullo-Mitterrandism", behind the "French status" in NATO: i.e. outside the integrated military command.

Relationships with other political leaders 
Although he initially enjoyed good relations with US President John F. Kennedy, who admired his stance against the Soviet Union—particularly when the Berlin Wall was being built—and who called him "a great captain of the Western world", their relationship later cooled. He was Kennedy's most loyal ally during the Cuban Missile Crisis and supported the right that the US claimed to defend its interests in the western hemisphere, in contrast to German Chancellor Konrad Adenauer who doubted Kennedy's commitment to Europe and thought the crisis could have been avoided. De Gaulle accepted that it might be necessary for the United States to take preemptive military action against Cuba, unlike many other European leaders of his time. De Gaulle was a prominent figure at the state funerals of two American presidents: Kennedy and Dwight Eisenhower (Eisenhower's funeral was his only visit to the U.S. since the funeral of JFK).

De Gaulle was admired by the later President Nixon. After a meeting at the Palace of Versailles just before the general left office, Nixon declared that "He did not try to put on airs but an aura of majesty seemed to envelop him ... his performance—and I do not use that word disparagingly—was breathtaking." On arriving for his funeral several months later, Nixon said of him, "greatness knows no national boundaries".

Lt. General Vernon A. Walters, a military attaché of Dwight Eisenhower and later military attaché in France from 1967 to 1973, noted the strong relationship between de Gaulle and Eisenhower, de Gaulle's unconditional support of Eisenhower during the U-2 incident, and de Gaulle's strong support of John F. Kennedy during the Cuban Missile Crisis. Thus Walters was intensely curious as to the great contrast between de Gaulle's close relations with two United States presidents during notable Cold War crises and de Gaulle's later decision to withdraw France from NATO's military command, and Walters spoke with many close military and political aides of de Gaulle.

Walters' conclusion, based upon de Gaulle's comments to many of his aides (and to Eisenhower during a meeting at Ramboullet Castle in 1959), is that de Gaulle feared that later United States presidents after Eisenhower would not have Eisenhower's special ties to Europe and would not risk nuclear war over Europe. Also, de Gaulle interpreted the peaceful resolution of the Cuban Missile Crisis without fighting to take back Cuba from communism a mere 90 miles from the United States as an indication that the United States might not fight for Europe's defense 3,500 miles away following Soviet aggression in Europe, but would only go to war following a nuclear strike against the United States itself. De Gaulle told Eisenhower that France did not seek to compete with the Strategic Air Command or army of the United States, but believed that France needed a way to strike the Soviet Union.

A number of commentators have been critical of de Gaulle for his failure to prevent the massacres after Algerian independence while others take the view that the struggle had been so long and savage that it was perhaps inevitable. The Australian historian Brian Crozier wrote, "that he was able to part with Algeria without civil war was a great though negative achievement which in all probability would have been beyond the capacity of any other leader France possessed." In April 1961, when four rebel generals seized power in Algeria, he "did not flinch in the face of this daunting challenge", but appeared on television in his general's uniform to forbid Frenchmen to obey the rebels' orders in an "inflexible display of personal authority".

De Gaulle was an excellent manipulator of the media, as seen in his shrewd use of television to persuade around 80% of Metropolitan France to approve the new constitution for the Fifth Republic. In so doing, he refused to yield to the reasoning of his opponents who said that, if he succeeded in Algeria, he would no longer be necessary. He afterwards enjoyed massive approval ratings, and once said that "every Frenchman is, has been or will be Gaullist".

That de Gaulle did not necessarily reflect mainstream French public opinion with his veto was suggested by the decisive majority of French people who voted in favour of British membership when the much more conciliatory Pompidou called a referendum on the matter in 1972. His early influence in setting the parameters of the EEC can still be seen today, most notably with the controversial Common Agricultural Policy.

Some writers take the view that Pompidou was a more progressive and influential leader than de Gaulle because, though also a Gaullist, he was less autocratic and more interested in social reforms. Although he followed the main tenets of de Gaulle's foreign policy, he was keen to work towards warmer relations with the United States. A banker by profession, Pompidou is also widely credited, as de Gaulle's prime minister from 1962 to 1968, with putting in place the reforms which provided the impetus for the economic growth which followed.

In 1968, shortly before leaving office, de Gaulle refused to devalue the Franc on grounds of national prestige, but upon taking over Pompidou reversed the decision almost straight away. It was ironic, that during the financial crisis of 1968, France had to rely on American (and West German) financial aid to help shore up the economy.

Perry has written that the "events of 1968 illustrated the brittleness of de Gaulle's rule. That he was taken by surprise is an indictment of his rule; he was too remote from real life and had no interest in the conditions under which ordinary French people lived. Problems like inadequate housing and social services had been ignored. The French greeted the news of his departure with some relief as the feeling had grown that he had outlived his usefulness. Perhaps he clung onto power too long, perhaps he should have retired in 1965 when he was still popular."

Brian Crozier said "the fame of de Gaulle outstrips his achievements, he chose to make repeated gestures of petulance and defiance that weakened the west without compensating advantages to France"

Régis Debray called de Gaulle "super-lucide" and pointed out that virtually all of his predictions, such as the fall of communism, the reunification of Germany and the resurrection of 'old' Russia, came true after his death. Debray compared him with Napoleon ('the great political myth of the 19th century'), calling de Gaulle his 20th century equivalent. "The sublime, it seems, appears in France only once a century ... Napoleon left two generations dead on battlefield. De Gaulle was more sparing with other people's blood; even so, he left us, as it were, stranded, alive but dazed... A delusion, perhaps, but one that turns the world upside down: causes events and movements; divides people into supporters and adversaries; leaves traces in the form of civil and penal codes and railways, factories and institutions (the Fifth Republic has already lasted three times as long as the Empire). A statesman who gets something going, who has followers, escapes the reality of the reports and statistics and become part of imagination. Napoleon and de Gaulle modified the state of things because they modified souls".

However, Debray pointed out that there is a difference between Napoleon and de Gaulle: "How can the exterminator be compared with the liberator? ... The former ran the whole enterprise into the ground, while the latter managed to save it. So that to measure the rebel against the despot, the challenger against the leader, is just glaringly idiotic. You simply do not put an adventurer who worked for himself or his family on the same level as a commander-in-chief serving his country. ... Regrettably, Gaullism and Bonapartism have a number of features in common, but Napoleon and de Gaulle do not have the same moral value. ... the first wanted a Holy French Empire without the faith, a Europe under French occupation. The second wanted to rescue the nation from the emperors and establish a free France in a free Europe".

While de Gaulle had many admirers, he was at the same time one of the most hated and reviled men in modern French history.

Memorials 

 
A number of monuments have been built to commemorate the life of Charles de Gaulle.
France's largest airport, located in Roissy, outside Paris, is named Charles de Gaulle Airport in his honour. France's nuclear-powered aircraft carrier is also named after him.

Honours and awards

French 
  Grand-Croix of the Légion d'honneur – 1945 (Officer – 1934; Knight – 1919)
  Grand Master of the Ordre de la Libération
  Grand-Croix of the Ordre national du Mérite – 1963
  Croix de guerre 1915
  Croix de guerre (1939–1945)
   Combatant's Cross
  Medal for the War Wounded
  1914–1918 Inter-Allied Victory medal (France)
  1914–1918 Commemorative war medal (France)
  1939–1945 Commemorative war medal (France)

Foreign 
  Silver Cross of Virtuti Militari of Poland (1920)
  Chief Commander of the US Legion of Merit (24 August 1945)
  Grand Cordon of the Order of the Dragon of Annam (last awarded 1945)
  Knight Grand Cross decorated with Grand Cordon of the Order of Merit of the Italian Republic (16 June 1959)
  Knight of the Order of the Royal House of Chakri of Thailand (11 October 1960)
  Knight of the Royal Order of the Seraphim (Sweden, 8 May 1963)
  Collar of the Order of Merit of Chile (October 1964)
  Knight of the Order of the Elephant (Denmark, 5 April 1965)
  Knight Grand Cross with Collar of the Royal Norwegian Order of St. Olav (1962)
  Knight Grand Cross of the Order of the White Rose of Finland with Collar (1962)
  Knight Grand Cross of the Royal Order of Cambodia
  Grand Cross of the Order of the Million Elephants and the White Parasol of Laos
  Extraordinary Grand Cross of the Order of Boyaca of Colombia
  Grand Cross of the Sharifian Order of Military Merit of Morocco
  Grand Collar of the Order of the Liberator General San Martín
  National Order of Merit of Ecuador
  Grand Cordon of the Order of Military Merit of Brazil
  National Order of Merit of Paraguay
  Grand Cordon of the Order of the Sun of Peru
  Grand Collar and Medal of the Order of the Southern Cross of Brazil
  Grand Collar of the Order of Pahlavi of Iran
  Grand Cross of the Military Order of Ayacucho of Peru
  Grand Collar of the Order of the Aztec Eagle of Mexico
  Grand Cordon of the Order of the Two Rivers of Iraq
  Collar of the Order of the Liberator of Venezuela
  Collar of the National Order of the Condor of the Andes of Bolivia
  Grand Cordon of the Order of Umayyad of Syria
  Grand Cross of the National Order of the Cedar of Lebanon
  Member of the Order of the Benevolent Ruler of Nepal
  Grand Cross of the Order of Leopold of Belgium
  Grand Cross of the Order of Saint-Charles of Monaco (5 October 1944)
  Grand Cross of the Order of Merit of the Federal Republic of Germany
  Collar of the Order of Al-Hussein bin Ali (Jordan)
  Knight of the Supreme Order of Christ of the Vatican
  Knight Grand Collar of the Order of Pius IX of the Vatican
  Grand Officer of the Order of the Redeemer of Greece
  Knight Grand Cross of the Royal Victorian Order of the United Kingdom
  Papal Lateran Cross of the Vatican
  Grand Cross of the Order of Polonia Restituta of Poland
  Commander of the Bavarian Order of Merit

Medals 
 Medal of the Mexican Academy of Military Studies
 Medal of Rancagua of Chile
 Medal of Mexico
 Medal of the Legionnaires of Quebec
 Medal of the City of Valparaiso
 Medal of Honour of the Congress of Peru
 Iraqi medal
 Plaque and Medal of the City of Lima, Peru
 Royal Medal of Tunisia
 Medal of the City of New Orleans
 Pakistani medal
 Greek medal
 Order of the American Legion
 Medal of the College Joseph Celestine Mutis of Spain

Works

French editions 
 La Discorde Chez l'Ennemi (1924)
 Histoire des Troupes du Levant (1931) Written by Major de Gaulle and Major Yvon, with Staff Colonel de Mierry collaborating in the preparation of the final text.
 Le Fil de l'Épée (1932)
 Vers l'Armée de Métier (1934)
 La France et son Armée (1938)
 Trois Études (1945) (Rôle Historique des Places Fortes; Mobilisation Economique à l'Étranger; Comment Faire une Armée de Métier) followed by the Memorandum of 26 January 1940.
 
 Volume I – L'Appel 1940–1942 (1954)
 Volume II – L'Unité, 1942–1944 (1956)
 Volume III – Le Salut, 1944–1946 (1959)
 Mémoires d'Espoir
 Volume I – Le Renouveau 1958–1962 (1970)
 Discours et Messages
 Volume I – Pendant la Guerre 1940–1946 (1970)
 Volume II – Dans l'attente 1946–1958 (1970)
 Volume III – Avec le Renouveau 1958–1962 (1970)
 Volume IV – Pour l'Effort 1962–1965 (1970)
 Volume V – Vers le Terme 1966–1969

English translations 
 The Enemy's House Divided (La Discorde chez l'ennemi). Tr. by Robert Eden. University of North Carolina Press, Chapel Hill, 2002.
 The Edge of the Sword (Le Fil de l'Épée). Tr. by Gerard Hopkins. Faber, London, 1960 Criterion Books, New York, 1960
 The Army of the Future (Vers l'Armée de Métier). Hutchinson, London-Melbourne, 1940. Lippincott, New York, 1940
 France and Her Army (La France et son Armée). Tr. by F.L. Dash. Hutchinson London, 1945. Ryerson Press, Toronto, 1945
 War Memoirs: Call to Honour, 1940–1942 (L'Appel). Tr. by Jonathan Griffin. Collins, London, 1955 (2 volumes). Viking Press, New York, 1955.
 War Memoirs: Unity, 1942–1944 (L'Unité). Tr. by Richard Howard (narrative) and Joyce Murchie and Hamish Erskine (documents). Weidenfeld & Nicolson, London, 1959 (2 volumes). Simon & Schuster, New York, 1959 (2 volumes).
 War Memoirs: Salvation, 1944–1946 (Le Salut). Tr. by Richard Howard (narrative) and Joyce Murchie and Hamish Erskine (documents). Weidenfeld & Nicolson, London, 1960 (2 volumes). Simon & Schuster, New York, 1960 (2 volumes).
 Memoirs of Hope: Renewal, 1958–1962. Endeavour, 1962– (Le Renouveau) (L'Effort). Tr. by Terence Kilmartin. Weidenfeld & Nicolson, London, 1971.

See also 
 Foreign policy of Charles de Gaulle
 France's neocolonialism
 Gaullism
 Gaullist Party
 List of names and terms of address used for Charles de Gaulle
 List of things named after Charles de Gaulle

References

Further reading

Biographies 
 Cogan, Charles. Charles de Gaulle: A Brief Biography with Documents. (1995). 243 pp.
 Fenby, Jonathan, The General: Charles de Gaulle and the France He Saved. (2011). Simon & Schuster. 
 Jackson, Julian, A Certain Idea of France: The Life of Charles de Gaulle (2018) 887pp.
 Lacouture, Jean, De Gaulle: The Rebel 1890–1944 (1984; English ed. 1991), 640 pp; excerpt and text search; vol 2. De Gaulle: The Ruler 1945–1970 (1993), 700 pp, a standard scholarly biography.
 
 Shennan, Andrew. De Gaulle (1993) 200 pp.
 Williams, Charles. The Last Great Frenchman: A Life of General De Gaulle (1997), 560pp. excerpt and text search

World War II 
 Berthon, Simon. Allies at War: The Bitter Rivalry among Churchill, Roosevelt, and de Gaulle. (2001). 356 pp.
  - Total pages: 238 
 Danan, Yves Maxime, République française : capitale Alger (1940–1944), L'Harmattan, Paris, 2019.
 DePorte, Anton W. De Gaulle's foreign policy, 1944–1946 (1967)
 Funk, Arthur Layton. Charles de Gaulle: The Crucial Years, 1943–1944 (1959) online edition
 Keegan, John (1994) [1982] Six Armies in Normandy: From D-Day to the Liberation of Paris .
 Kersaudy, Francois. Churchill and De Gaulle (2nd ed 1990) 482pp.
 La Feber, Walter. "Roosevelt, Churchill, and Indochina: 1942–45." American Historical Review (1975): 1277–1295. in JSTOR
  - Total pages: 512 
 Pratt, Julius W. "De Gaulle and the United States: How the Rift Began," History Teacher (1968) 1#4 pp. 5–15 in JSTOR
 Rossi, Mario. "United States Military Authorities and Free France, 1942–1944," The Journal of Military History (1997) 61#1 pp. 49–64 in JSTOR
 Weinberg, Gerhard L. Visions of Victory: The Hopes of Eight World War II Leaders. (2005). 292 pp. chapter on de Gaulle

Politics 
 Berstein, Serge, and Peter Morris. The Republic of de Gaulle 1958–1969 (The Cambridge History of Modern France) (2006) excerpt and text search
 Cameron, David R. and Hofferbert, Richard I. "Continuity and Change in Gaullism: the General's Legacy." American Journal of Political Science 1973 17(1): 77–98. , a statistical analysis of the Gaullist voting coalition in elections 1958–73 Fulltext: Abstract in Jstor
 Cogan, Charles G. "The Break-up: General de Gaulle's Separation from Power," Journal of Contemporary History Vol. 27, No. 1 (Jan. 1992), pp. 167–199, re: 1969 in JSTOR
 Diamond, Robert A. France under de Gaulle (Facts on File, 1970), highly detailed chronology 1958–1969.  319pp
 Furniss, Edgar J., Jr. De Gaulle and the French Army. (1964)
 Gough, Hugh and Horne, John, eds. De Gaulle and Twentieth-Century France. (1994). 158 pp. essays by experts
 Hauss, Charles. Politics in Gaullist France: Coping with Chaos (1991) online edition
 Hoffmann, Stanley. Decline or Renewal? France since the 1930s (1974) online edition
 Jackson, Julian. "General de Gaulle and His Enemies: Anti-Gaullism in France Since 1940," Transactions of the Royal Historical Society 6th Ser., Vol. 9 (1999), pp. 43–65 in JSTOR
 Merom, Gil. "A 'Grand Design'? Charles de Gaulle and the End of the Algerian War," Armed Forces & Society(1999) 25#2 pp: 267–287 online
 Nester, William R. De Gaulle's Legacy: The Art of Power in France's Fifth Republic (Palgrave Macmillan, 2014)
 Northcutt, Wayne. Historical Dictionary of the French Fourth and Fifth Republics, 1946–1991 (1992)
 Pierce, Roy, "De Gaulle and the RPF—A Post-Mortem," The Journal of Politics Vol. 16, No. 1 (Feb. 1954), pp. 96–119 in JSTOR
 Rioux, Jean-Pierre, and Godfrey Rogers. The Fourth Republic, 1944–1958 (The Cambridge History of Modern France) (1989)
 Shepard, Todd. The Invention of Decolonization: The Algerian War and the Remaking of France. (2006). 288 pp.
 Williams, Philip M. and Martin Harrison. De Gaulle's Republic (1965) online edition

Foreign policy 

 Bozo, Frédéric. Two Strategies for Europe: De Gaulle, the United States and the Atlantic Alliance (2000)
 Gordon, Philip H. A Certain Idea of France: French Security Policy and the Gaullist Legacy (1993) online edition
 Grosser, Alfred. French foreign policy under De Gaulle (Greenwood Press, 1977)
 Hoffmann, Stanley. "The Foreign Policy of Charles de Gaulle." in The Diplomats, 1939–1979 (Princeton University Press, 2019) pp. 228–254. online
 Kolodziej, Edward A. French International Policy under de Gaulle and Pompidou: The Politics of Grandeur (1974) online edition
 Kulski, W. W. De Gaulle and the World: The Foreign Policy of the Fifth French Republic (1966) online free to borrow
 Logevall, Fredrik. "De Gaulle, Neutralization, and American Involvement in Vietnam, 1963–1964," Pacific Historical Review 61#1 (Feb. 1992), pp. 69–102 in JSTOR
 Mahan, E. Kennedy, De Gaulle and Western Europe. (2002). 229 pp.
 Mangold, Peter. The Almost Impossible Ally: Harold Macmillan and Charles de Gaulle. (2006). 275 pp. IB Tauris, London, 
 Martin, Garret Joseph. General de Gaulle's Cold War: Challenging American Hegemony, 1963–1968 (Berghahn Books; 2013) 272 pages
 Moravcsik, Andrew. "Charles de Gaulle and Europe: The New Revisionism." Journal of Cold War Studies (2012) 14#1 pp: 53–77.
 Nuenlist, Christian. Globalizing de Gaulle: International Perspectives on French Foreign Policies, 1958–1969 (2010)
 Newhouse, John. De Gaulle and the Anglo-Saxons (New York: Viking Press, 1970)
 Paxton, Robert O. and Wahl, Nicholas, eds. De Gaulle and the United States: A Centennial Reassessment. (1994). 433 pp.
 White, Dorothy Shipley. Black Africa and de Gaulle: From the French Empire to Independence. (1979). 314 pp.

Ideas and memory 
 Cerny, Philip G. The Politics of Grandeur: Ideological Aspects of de Gaulle's Foreign Policy. (1980). 319 pp.
 Clague, Monique. "Conceptions of Leadership: Charles de Gaulle and Max Weber," Political Theory (1975) 3#4 pp. 423–440 in JSTOR
 Converse, Philip E., et al. De Gaulle and Eisenhower: The public image of the victorious general (1961), Statistical analysis of public opinion polls in US and France
 Hazareesingh, Sudhir. In the Shadow of the General: Modern France and the Myth of De Gaulle (2012) online review
 Hoffmann, Stanley. "The Hero as History: De Gaulle's War Memoirs" in Hoffman Decline or Renewal? France since the 1930s (1974) pp 187–201 online edition
 Johnson, Douglas. "The Political Principles of General de Gaulle," International Affairs (1965) 41#4 pp. 650–662 in JSTOR
 Mahoney, Daniel J. De Gaulle: Statesmanship, Grandeur, and Modern Democracy. (1996). 188 pp. intellectual history
 Mahoney, Daniel J. "A 'Man of Character': The Statesmanship of Charles de Gaulle," Polity (1994) 27#1 pp. 157–173 in JSTOR
 Morrisey, Will. "Reflections on De Gaulle: Political Founding in Modernity." (2002). 266 pp. intellectual history
 Pedley, Alan. As Mighty as the Sword: A Study of the Writings of Charles de Gaulle (1996) 226pp

External links 

 Fondation Charles-de-Gaulle
 
 
 Mémorial Charles de Gaulle
 

 
1890 births
1970 deaths
20th-century presidents of France
20th-century Princes of Andorra
Collège Stanislas de Paris alumni
Conservatism in France
Charles
École Spéciale Militaire de Saint-Cyr alumni
French anti-communists
French Army officers
French Army personnel who were court-martialed
French generals
French military personnel of World War I
French military personnel of World War II
French military writers
French nationalists
French people of the Algerian War
French prisoners of war in World War I
French Roman Catholics
 
Grand Croix of the Légion d'honneur
Grand Cross of the Ordre national du Mérite
Grand Masters of the Order of Liberation
Heads of state of France
Knights Grand Cross of the Royal Victorian Order
Knights Grand Cross of the Royal Order of Cambodia
Knights Grand Cross with Collar of the Order of Merit of the Italian Republic
Politicians from Lille
People of the Cold War
People of the Nigerian Civil War
People sentenced to death in absentia
French political party founders
Prime Ministers of France
Recipients of the Croix de Guerre 1914–1918 (France)
Recipients of the Croix de Guerre 1939–1945 (France)
Recipients of the Order of the Dragon of Annam
Recipients of the Silver Cross of the Virtuti Militari
World War I prisoners of war held by Germany
World War II political leaders
Deaths from aneurysm
Neurological disease deaths in France
French people of Irish descent
French people of Scottish descent
French people of Dutch descent
French people of Belgian descent
French people of German descent
Shooting survivors
Time Person of the Year
Grand Crosses of the Order of Saint-Charles